= Pali literature =

Oldest Buddhist texts in Middle Indo-Aryan language native to the Indian subcontinent

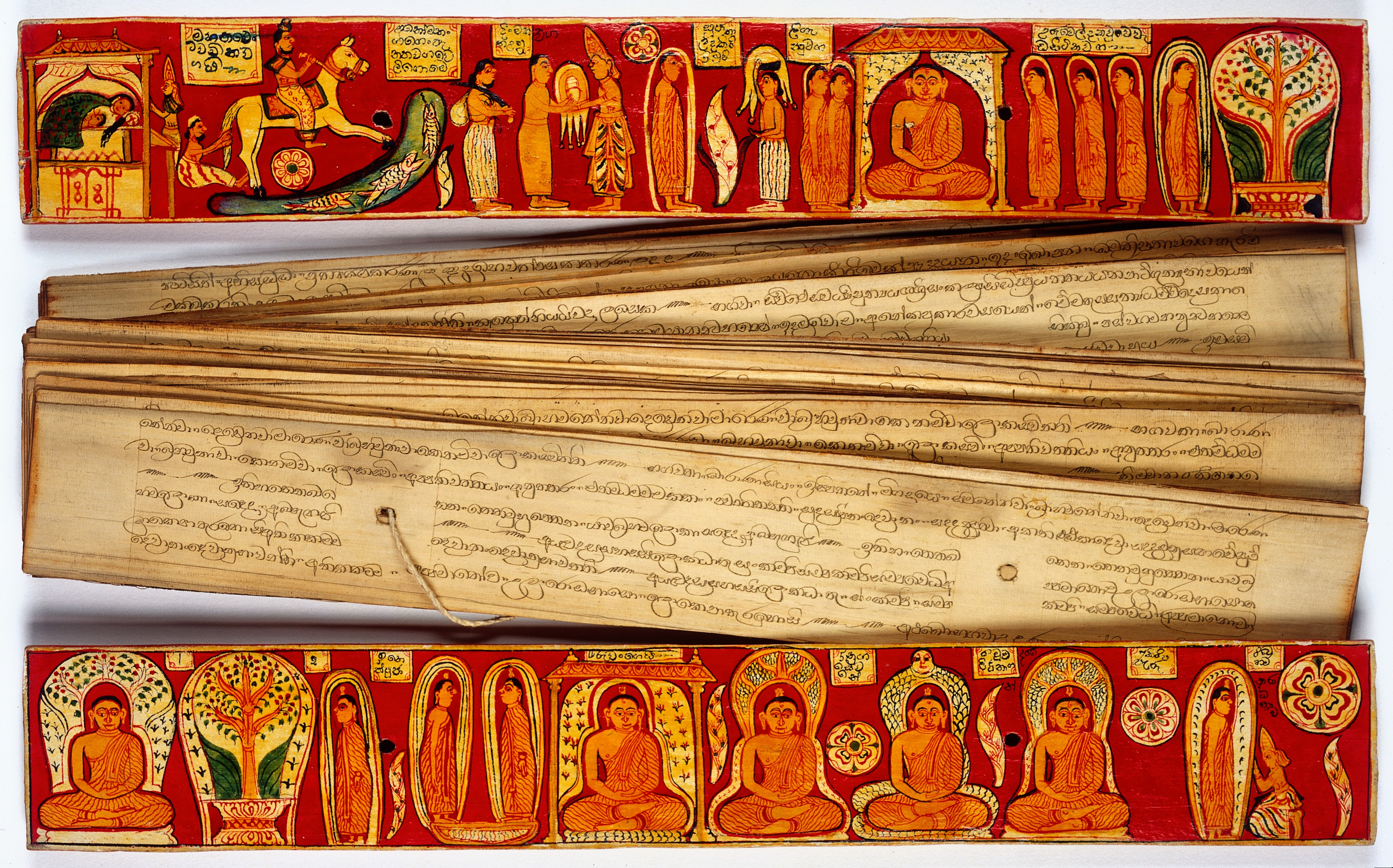
Pre-modern copies of the Tipiṭaka were preserved in Palm-leaf manuscripts, most of which have not survived the humid climate of South Asia and Southeast Asia.

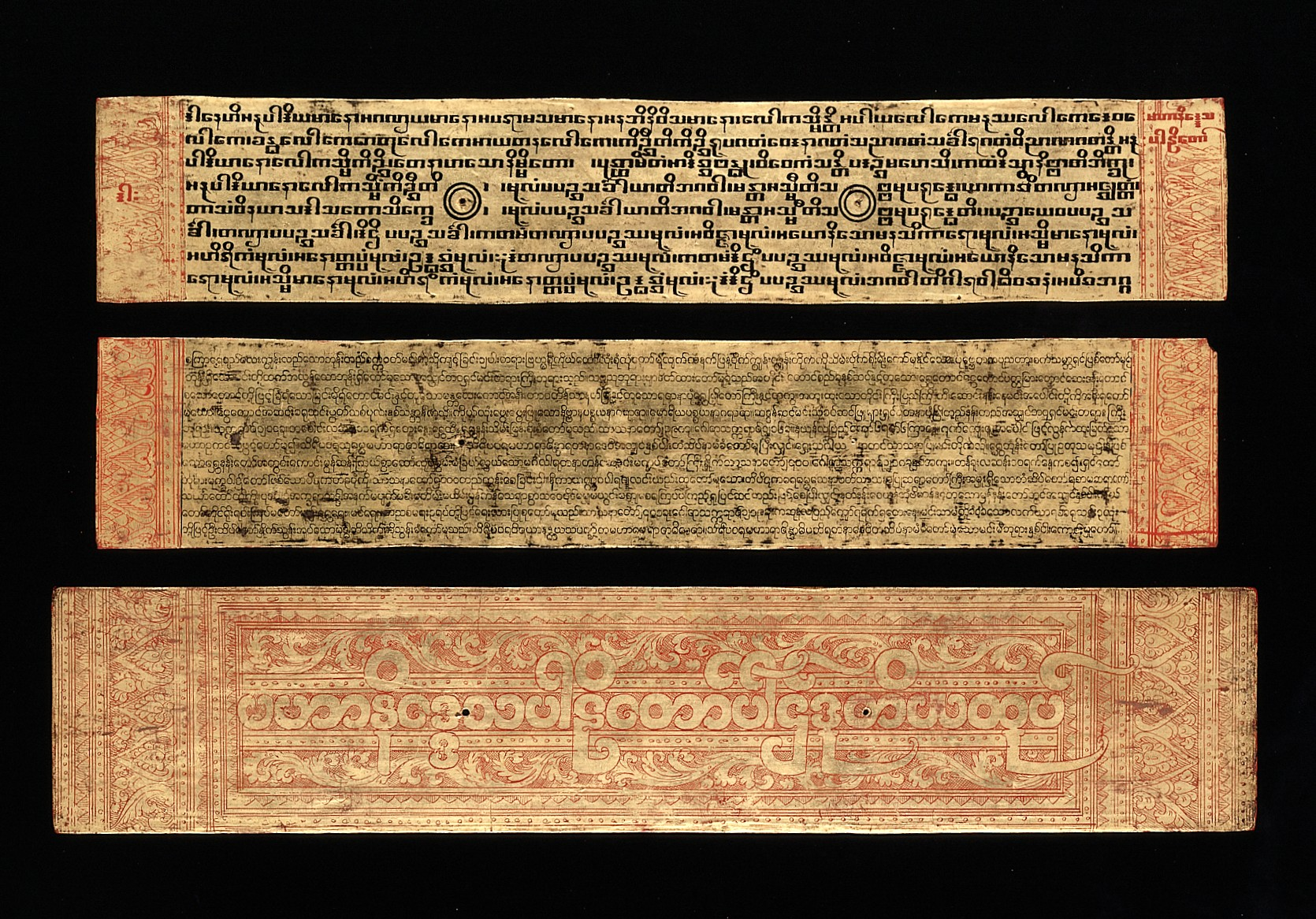
Burmese-Pali manuscript copy of the Buddhist text Mahaniddesa, showing three different types of Burmese script, (top) medium square, (centre) round and (bottom) outline round in red lacquer from the inside of one of the gilded covers

Pali literature is concerned mainly with Theravada Buddhism, of which Pali (IAST: pāl̤i) is the traditional language. The earliest and most important Pali literature constitutes the Pāli Canon, the authoritative scriptures of Theravada school.

Pali literature includes numerous genres, including Suttas (Buddhist discourses), Vinaya (monastic discipline), Abhidhamma (philosophy), poetry, history, philology, hagiography, scriptural exegesis, and meditation manuals.

== History ==
The Pali language is a composite language which draws on various Middle Indo-Aryan languages.

Much of the extant Pali literature is from Sri Lanka, which became the headquarters of Theravada for centuries. Most extant Pali literature was written and composed there, though some was also produced in outposts in South India. Most of the oldest collection of Pali Literature, the Pali Canon, was committed to writing in Sri Lanka at about the first century BCE (though it contains material that is much older, possibly dating to the period of pre-sectarian Buddhism).

At around the start of the common era, some of the earliest Pali commentaries and exegetical manuals (which are now sometimes included within the Pali Canon itself) were written, mainly the Suttavibhanga, Niddesa, Nettipakarana and Petakopadesa. Other works like the Cariyapitaka, the Buddhavamsa and the Apadana may also belong to this post-Asokan period.

During the first millennium, Pali literature consisted of two major genres: histories (vamsa) and commentaries (atthakatha). The histories include the Dipavamsa and the Mahavamsa, which are verse chronicles of Buddhism in India and Sri Lanka.

The commentarial works include the writings of Buddhaghosa (4th or 5th century CE), who wrote the influential Visuddhimagga along with various commentaries on the Pali Canon. Several other commentators worked after Buddhaghosa, such as Buddhadatta (c. fifth century), Ananda (sixth century), Dhammapala (at some point before the 12th century) and other anonymous commentators which we do not know by name.

The reform period between the 10th to 13th centuries saw an explosion of new Pali literature. Part of the impulse behind these literary efforts was the fear that warfare on the island could lead to the decline of Buddhism. This literature includes the work of prominent scholars such as Anuruddha, Sumangala, Siddhattha, Sāriputta Thera, Mahākassapa of Dimbulagala and Moggallana Thera.

They worked on compiling subcommentaries to the Tipitaka, grammars, summaries and textbooks on Abhidhamma and Vinaya such as the influential Abhidhammattha-sangaha of Anuruddha. They also wrote kavya style Pali poetry and philological works. Their work owed much to the influence of Sanskrit grammar and poetics, particularly as interpreted by the Sri Lankan scholar Ratnamati. During this period, these new Pali doctrinal works also show an increasing awareness of topics found in Sanskrit Buddhist Mahayana literature.

From the 15th century onwards, Pali literature has been dominated by Burma, though some has also been written in Thailand, Laos and Cambodia, as well as Ceylon. This Burmese literature has in turn been dominated by writings directly or indirectly concerned with the Abhidhamma Pitaka, the part of the Canon variously described as philosophy, psychology, metaphysics etc.

== Canonical and post-canonical Pali literature ==
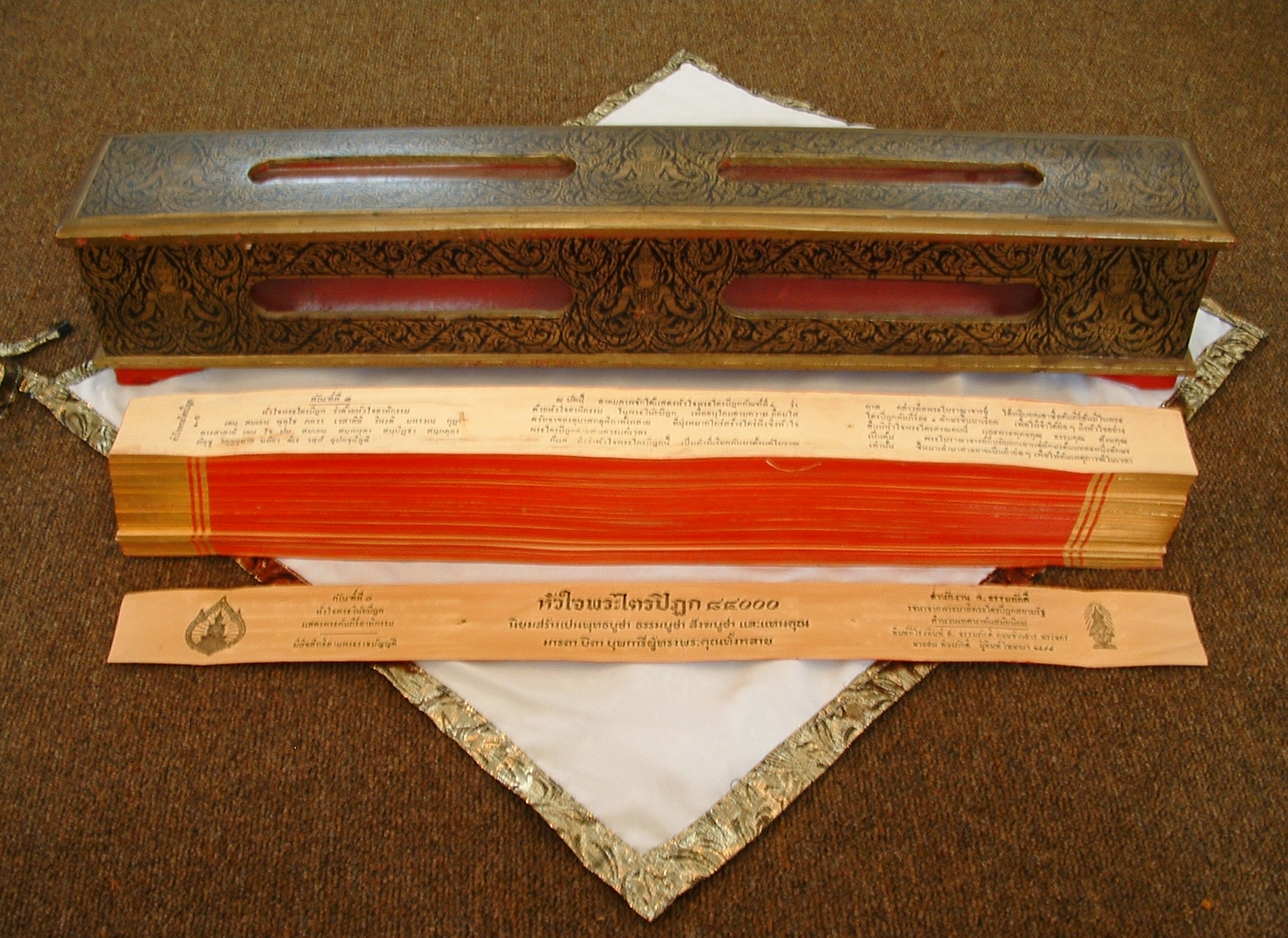
A Palm-leaf style manuscript from a Thai Tipitaka

=== Pali Tipitaka ===
The earliest and most important Pali literature constitutes the Pali Tipitaka, the main scripture collection of the Theravada school. These are of Indian origin, and were written down during the reign of Vattagamani Abhaya (29—17 B.C.) in Sri Lanka.

The Tipitaka ("Triple Basket"), also known as Pali Canon, is divided into three "baskets" (Pali: piṭaka):

1. Vinaya Piṭaka (Basket of the Monastic Discipline)
  1. Suttavibhaṅga: Pāṭimokkha (a list of rules for monastics) and commentary
  2. Khandhaka: 22 chapters on various topics
  3. Parivāra: analyses of rules from various points of view
2. Sutta Piṭaka (Basket of Sayings/Discourses), mostly ascribed to the Buddha, but some to his disciples.
  1. Digha Nikāya, the "long" discourses.
  2. Majjhima Nikāya, the "middle-length" discourses.
  3. Saṁyutta Nikāya, the "connected" discourses.
  4. Anguttara Nikāya, the "numerical" discourses.
  5. Khuddaka Nikāya, the "minor collection".
3. Abhidhamma Piṭaka (Basket of Abhidhamma, i.e. Philosophical Psychology). According to K.R. Norman, "It is clear that the Abhidhamma is later than the rest of the canon."
  1. Dhammasaṅganī
  2. Vibhaṅga
  3. Dhātukathā
  4. Puggalapaññatti
  5. Kathāvatthu
  6. Yamaka
  7. Paṭṭhāna

=== Paracanonical texts ===
Paracanonical texts are works written after the closure of the canon. One of the collections of paracanonical books is the quasi-canonical texts.

==== Quasi-canonical texts ====
"Quasi-canonical texts" is used by Western scholars to refer to various texts on the fringes of the Pali Canon of Theravada Buddhism, usually to refer to the following texts sometimes regarded as included in the Pali Canon's Khuddaka Nikaya The first two of these texts are present in the Khuddaka Nikaya of the Burmese and Sri Lankan Tipitaka but not in the Thai edition. The third text is included only in the Burmese edition. The fourth text is included only in the Sinhalese edition. They are also not mentioned by Buddhaghosa as being part of the canon.

1. Nettipakarana - "The Book of Guidance", a work on exegesis and hermeneutics
2. Petakopadesa - "Instruction on the Pitaka", another text on exegesis and hermeneutics
3. Milindapañha - The Questions of King Milinda. A dialogue between a monk and an Indo-Greek king.
4. Suttasaṃgaha - A collection of important suttas from the Tipitaka

In the common editions known to the modern Buddhist world, the Nettipakaraṇa, Peṭakopadesa, and Milindapañha are generally considered to be part of the Khuddaka Nikāya of the Sutta Piṭaka.

==== Other paracanonical texts ====
Other paracanonical works include the commentaries (aṭṭhakathā), the treatises (like the Visuddhimagga), and the historical works.

== Exegesis ==
=== Atthakatha ===
A collection of Pali Commentaries (Aṭṭhakathā) were written in Sri Lanka by various (some anonymous) authors, such as Buddhagosa, Dhammapala, Mahanama, Upasena, and Buddhadatta. Buddhagosa writes that he based his commentaries on older works which were brought to Sri Lanka when Buddhism first arrived there, and were translated into Sinhalese. K.R. Norman has written that there is evidence that some parts of the commentaries are very old.

=== Tika ===
Sub-commentarial works (Ṭīkā) are secondary commentaries, that is to say, commentaries on the Aṭṭhakathās. Dhammapala is one early author of ṭīkās.

=== Añña ===
In the classification established at the Sixth Buddhist Council (Chaṭṭha Saṅgāyana), Añña (literally meaning "Other") refers to the group of non-canonical texts outside the Tipiṭaka, Aṭṭhakathā (commentaries), and Ṭīkā (sub-commentaries). This literary category encompasses important doctrinal expositions such as Buddhaghosa's Visuddhimagga, historical chronicles (vaṃsa) like the Mahāvaṃsa and Sāsanavaṃsa, grammatical treatises (byākaraṇa), and collections of moral and ethical maxims (nīti). Works in this category have played a key role in synthesizing, preserving, and transmitting Theravāda teachings across South and Southeast Asia throughout history.

According to the Sixth Buddhist Council's compilation, the Añña corpus is systematically categorized into standalone treatises and several major collections (saṅgaha), which include:

- Standalone works: The Visuddhimagga and Saṅgāyanapucchavissajjanā.
- Leḍīsayāḍoganthasaṅgaha (Works of Ledi Sayadaw): Niruttidīpanī, Paramatthadīpanī, Anudīpanīpāṭha, and Paṭṭhānuddesa dīpanīpāṭha.
- Buddhavandanāganthasaṅgaha (Devotional works): Namakkāraṭīkā, Mahāpaṇāmapāṭha, Lakkhaṇāto buddhathomanāgāthā, Sutavandanā, Kamalāñjalī, Jinālaṅkāra, Pajjamadhu, and Buddhaguṇagāthāvali.
- Vaṃsaganthasaṅgaha (Chronicles): Cūlaganthavaṃsa, Mahāvaṃsa, and Sāsanavaṃsa.
- Byākaraṇaganthasaṅgaha (Grammatical treatises): Kaccāyanabyākaraṇaṃ, Moggallānabyākaraṇaṃ, Saddanītippakaraṇaṃ (padamālā & dhātumālā), Padarūpasiddhi, Moggallānapañcikā, Payogasiddhipāṭha, Vuttodayapāṭha, Abhidhānappadīpikāpāṭha, Abhidhānappadīpikāṭīkā, Subodhālaṅkārapāṭha, Subodhālaṅkāraṭīkā, and Bālāvatāra gaṇṭhipadatthavinicchayasāra.
- Nītiganthasaṅgaha (Ethical maxims): Lokanīti, Suttantanīti, Sūrassatinīti, Mahārahanīti, Dhammanīti, Kavidappaṇanīti, Nītimañjarī, Naradakkhadīpanī, Caturārakkhadīpanī, and Cāṇakyanīti.
- Pakiṇṇakaganthasaṅgaha (Miscellaneous texts): Rasavāhinī, Sīmavisodhanīpāṭha, and Vesantaragīti.
- Sihaḷaganthasaṅgaha (Sinhalese tradition works): Moggallānavuttivivaraṇapañcikā, Thūpavaṃsa, Dāṭhāvaṃsa, Dhātupāṭhavilāsiniyā, Dhātuvaṃsa, Hatthavanagallavihāravaṃsa, Jinacaritaya, Jinavaṃsadīpaṃ, Telakaṭāhagāthā, Milidaṭīkā, Padamañjarī, Padasādhanaṃ, Saddabindupakaraṇaṃ, Kaccāyanadhātumañjusā, and Sāmantakūṭavaṇṇanā.

== Classical treatises ==
=== Buddhaghosa ===
- Visuddhimagga – A comprehensive and influential manual of Theravāda doctrine and meditation practice. Considered Buddhaghosa’s magnum opus.

=== Buddhadatta ===
- Vinayavinicchaya – A verse summary of the first four books of the Vinaya.
- Uttaravinicchaya – A verse summary of the Parivāra, the final book of the Vinaya.
- Abhidhammavatara – An early effort at summarizing the doctrines in the Abhidhamma.
- Ruparupa-vibhaga – A short manual on Abhidhamma.

=== Summaries and manuals on monastic discipline ===
- Khuddasikkha and Mulasikkha – Brief verse summaries on monastic discipline, used for basic training.
- Simalankara – A treatise dealing with monastic boundaries (sima).

=== Acariya Anuruddha ===
- Abhidhammattha-sangaha – A concise and popular summary of the Abhidhamma, widely used as an introductory text (11th–12th century).
- Namarupa-pariccheda – A verse introduction to the Abhidhamma.
- Paramattha-vinicchaya – Attributed to Acariya Anuruddha; K.R. Norman suggests it may be the work of a different Anuruddha.

=== Other authors ===
- Saccasankhepa – By Culla-Dhammapala, a short treatise on Abhidhamma ("Elements of Truth") (7th century).
- Khemappakarana – By the nun Khema, a brief manual on the Abhidhamma.
- Mohavicchedani – By Mahakassapa of the Chola dynasty, a guide to the matikas (topics) of the seven books of the Abhidhamma (12th century).
- Nāmacāradīpikā – By Chappata (15th century).

=== Lay instruction and applied teachings ===
- Upasaka-janalankara – By Sihala Acariya Ananda Mahathera, a manual on the Buddha's teachings for lay disciples (Upāsakas) (13th century).
- Bhesajjamanjusa – A medical treatise from Sri Lanka integrating Buddhist knowledge (13th century).

=== Esoteric and meditation manuals ===
- Yogāvacara's manual – A Sri Lankan meditation manual (c. 16th–17th century) associated with Esoteric Theravāda (Borān-kammaṭṭhāna).
- Amatākaravaṇṇanā – An extensive esoteric meditation manual compiled by Kandyan Sinhalese students of Thai esoteric masters (c. 18th century).

== Historical chronicles ==
The following include various Buddhist historical chronicles (vamsa), organized by theme and time period:

=== Classical Sri Lankan chronicles ===
- Dipavamsa – "The Island Chronicle", the earliest extant Sri Lankan chronicle (4th century).
- Mahavamsa – "The Great Chronicle", composed by the monk Mahanama (6th century).
- Culavamsa – "The Lesser Chronicle", a continuation of the Mahavamsa.
- Vamsatthappakasini – A 6th-century commentary on the Mahavamsa.

=== Regional variants ===
- Cambodian Mahavamsa – A local expansion of the Mahavamsa, nearly double in length and including additional narratives.

=== Monument and relic chronicles ===
- Thupavamsa – By Vacissara (12th century), a chronicle of the Great Stupa in Anuradhapura.
- Dathavamsa – By Dhammakitti, focuses on relics such as the tooth relic.
- Chakesadhatuvamsa – A 14th-century history of the six stupas enshrining the Buddha’s hair relics.
- Hatthavanagallavihāravaṃsa - Chronicle text dealing with the history of the temple at Attanagalla, Sri Lanka. (13th century C.E.)
- Sihinganidāna - Chronicle of the Phra Buddha Sihing image of Lanna by the elder Mahathera Bodhiramsi in the 15th century.
- Ratanabimbavaṃsa - 15th century chronicle of the Emerald Buddha image of Lanna.

=== Biographical and poetic chronicles ===
- Samantakutavannana – By Vedehathera, a poem in 796 stanzas on the Buddha’s life and visits to Sri Lanka.
- Hatthavanagalla-viharavamsa – A 13th-century biography of King Sirisanghabodhi (r. 247–249 CE).
- Braḥ Māleyyadevattheravatthuṃ - A narrative of the travels of the monk Māleyyadeva
- Buddhaghosuppatti - Mahāmaṅgala, Story of Buddhagosa (Burma, 15th century)

=== Cosmological texts ===
- Candasuriyagati-dīpani – A Buddhist cosmological treatise.
- Loka-dīpanī – Another text on Buddhist cosmology.
- Lokapaññatti – A work on Theravāda cosmology, largely derived from the Sanskrit Lokaprajñapti.

=== Literary and ecclesiastical histories ===
- Saddhamma-sangaha – By Dhammakitti Mahasami (14th century), a literary and ecclesiastical history of Buddhism.
- Saddhammasangaha – A separate work providing historical and bibliographical information on Buddhist texts and authors.

=== Later period texts ===
- Sandesakatha - Late historical text dealing in part with the relationship between Sri Lanka and Burma in medieval times. (19th century C.E.)

== Poetry (mostly hagiographical) ==
Most Sinhalese Pali poetry is in kavya style, heavily influenced by Sanskrit literary conventions.

=== Early and classical poetry ===
- Mahabodhivamsa – By Upatissa (10th century), a historical poem focused on the Bodhi Tree and its veneration.
- Telakaṭāhagāthā – "The Oil-Cauldron Verses", a collection of Sri Lankan poems centered on a monk thrown into boiling oil for his convictions.
- Jinalankara – By Buddharakkhita (12th century), a 278-verse poem on the life of the Buddha.
- Anagatavamsa – By Mahākassapa of the Cola region (12th century), a narrative on the coming Buddha, Maitreya.
- Dasabodhisattuppattikatha – "Birth Stories of the Ten Bodhisattas".
- Dasabodhisattuddesa – Another collection of verses detailing the births of the Ten Bodhisattas.

=== Medieval to early modern period ===
- Jinacarita – By Medhankara (13th century), a 472-verse poetic biography of the Buddha.
- Pajjamadhu – By Buddhapiya Dipankara (13th century), a poem on the beauty and virtues of the Buddha.
- Samantakutavannana – By Vedeha (13th century), a poetic life story of the Bodhisatta Siddhattha and his visits to Sri Lanka.
- Pañcagatidīpanī – A didactic poem describing the five types of rebirth in Buddhist cosmology.
- Saddhammopāyana – A devotional work comprising 629 verses in praise of the Dhamma.

=== Modern period ===
- Jinavamsadipani – By Moratuve Medhananda Thera (1917), an epic 2000-verse poem narrating the Buddha’s life and teachings.
- Mahākassapacarita – By Widurapola Piyatissa (1934), a 1500-verse poem on the life of Mahākāśyapa, one of the Buddha’s chief disciples.

== Edifying tales ==
A genre which consists of stories in mixed prose and verse, often focusing on the advantages of giving (dana).

- Dasavatthuppakarana
- Sihalavatthuppakarana
- Sahassavatthuppakarana
- Rasavahini

== Linguistic works ==
Works on Pali language, mostly grammar.

- Abhidhānappadīpikā, Pali dictionary composed in the 12th century by the Sinhalese bhikkhu Moggallāna Thera.
- Kaccāyana-vyākarana, Date is unknown but after Buddhaghosa. It's the earliest and most influential grammar of Pali.
- Nyasa, or Mukhamattadipani by Vimalabuddhi (11th century), a commentary on Kaccayana's Grammar.
- Suttaniddesa or Nyasapradipa by Chapata or Saddhammajoti-pala
- Kaccayana-sara, ab abridgement of Kaccayana's Grammar written by Dhammananda
- Rupasiddhi, a re-arrangement of Kaccāyana-vyākarana
- Balavatara, a re-arrangement of Kaccāyana-vyākarana
- Moggallayana-vyakarana a.k.a. Saddalakkhana, and the auto-commentary Moggallayanapañcika is a new Pali grammar by Moggallana who created a new school of grammar c. 12th century.
- Saddanīti, by Aggavaṃsa of Arimaddana, an influential Pali grammar; Burma (c. 1154 CE). K.R. Norman calls it "the greatest of extant Pali grammars." It draws on Kaccayana and Panini.

== Poetics and prosody ==
Works on poetics and prosody.

- Subodhalankara of Sangharakkhita (12th century), a work on poetics
- Vuttodaya, a work on Pali meter by Sangharakkhita
- Sambandhacinta by Sangharakkhita, a work on verbs and syntax

== Non-canonical Jataka collections ==
These are jataka collections that are outside of the Pali Canon:

- Paññāsa Jātaka
- Sudhanukumara jataka
- Kosala-bimba-vannana, a story told in Jataka style about Buddha statues

== Gāthās and devotional material ==
- Jinapanjara Gatha
- Narasīha Gāthā
- Dhammakāyānussati Gāthā
- Sabbapattidāna Gāthā
- Devatādipattidāna Gāthā
- Uddissanādhiṭṭhāna Gāthā
- Dhammagārav’ādi Gāthā
- Jalanandana Paritta
- Anavum Paritta
- Aṭṭhavīsati Paritta

== Anthologies ==
Anthologies of various texts on different topics:

- Mahaparitta - A small collection of texts taken from the Suttapitaka
- Suttasamgaha - A selection of texts from the Tripitaka
- Sarasangaha - Siddhattha, A "manual of Dhamma" in prose and verse (13th century)
- Upasakajanalankara

== Burmese Pali literature ==
- Dhammasattha - A Southeast Asian genre of Buddhist law
- Dhammaniti, Lokaniti, Maharahaniti, and Rajaniti, collections of aphorisms of worldly wisdom (niti).
- Gandhavamsa - Catalog of ancient Buddhist commentators (19th century).
- Sāsanavaṃsa, written in 1861 by Paññasami, a history of Buddhism, including Burmese Buddhism.
- Sima-vivada-vinichaya-katha (19th century)
- Visuddhiñana-katha (The Progress of Insight) by Mahasi Sayadaw, originally in Burmese, translated to Pali (1950).

== Thai Pali literature ==
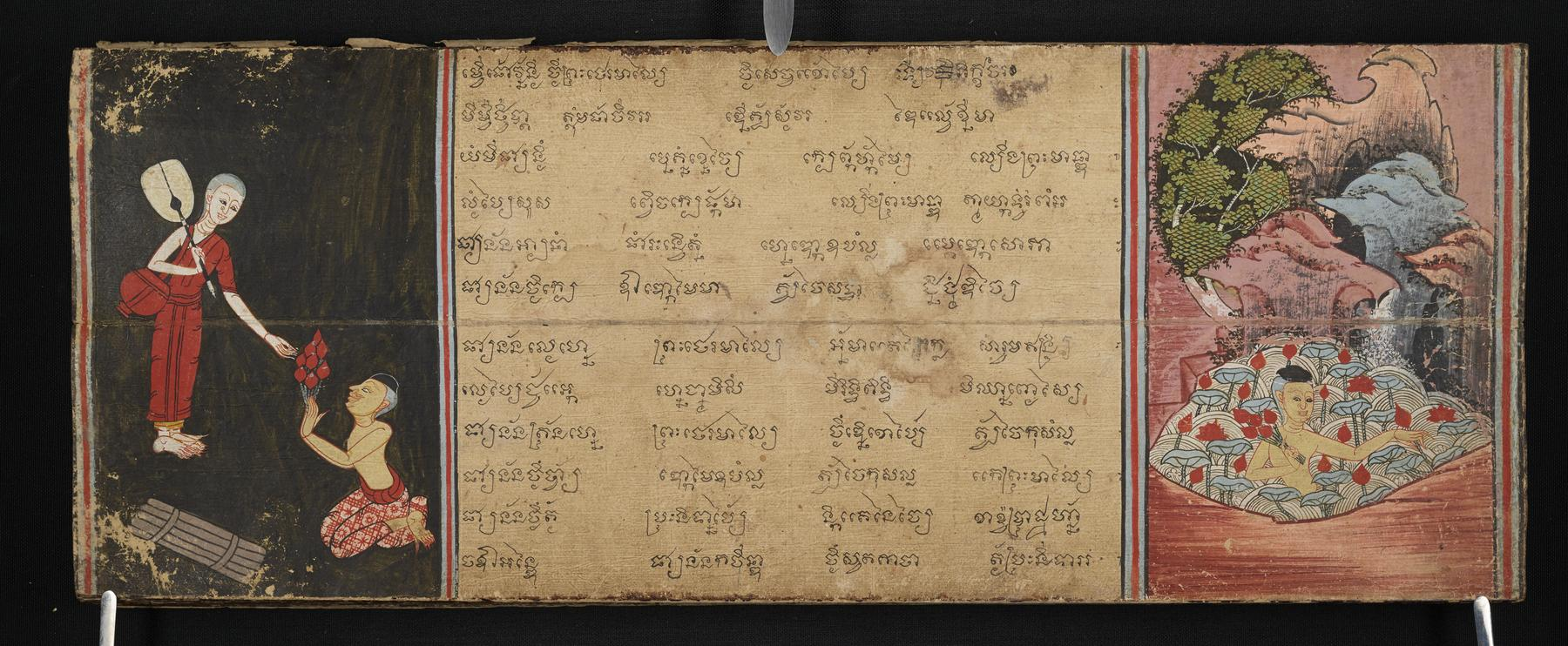
Illustrated Pali manuscript of the Abhidhamma chet kamphi (chanting prompts for text chanted at funerals)

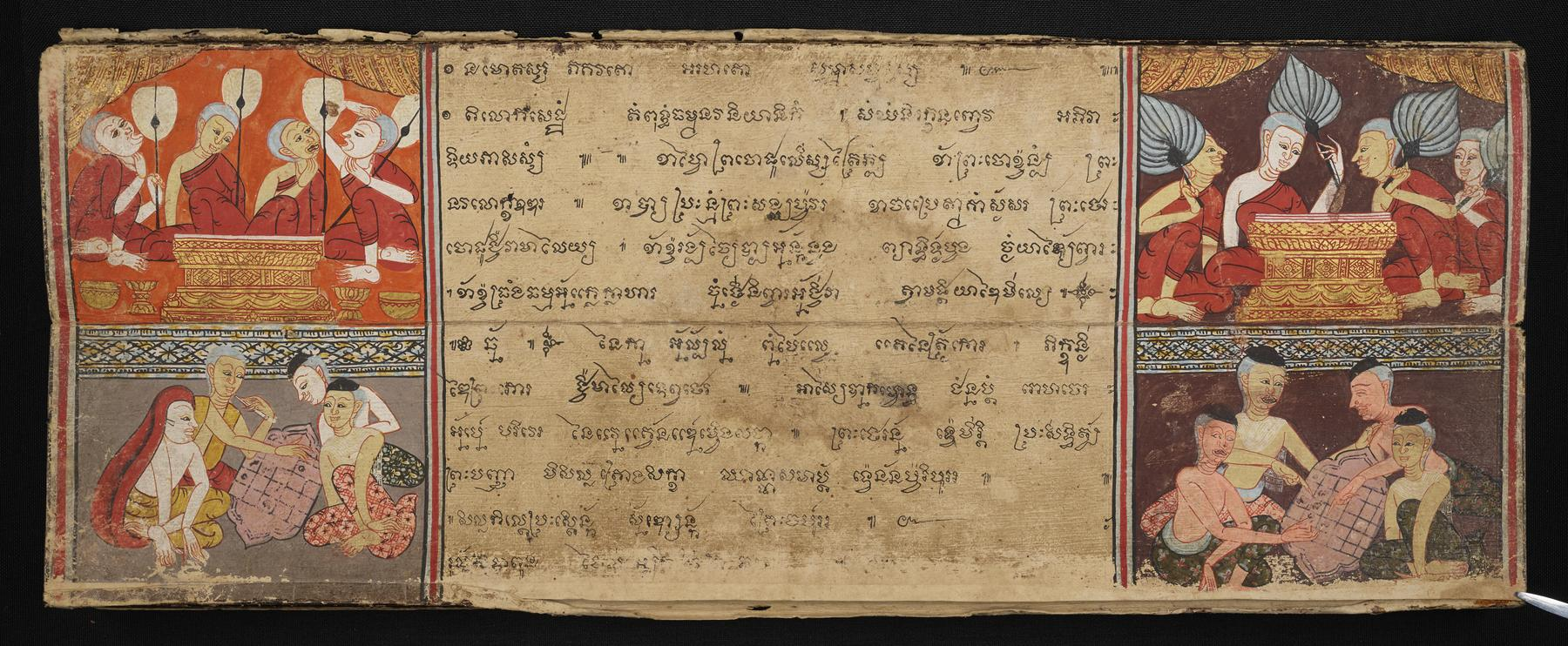
Illustrated Pali manuscript of the Abhidhamma chet kamphi (chanting prompts for text chanted at funerals)

- Cāmadevivaṃsa
- Cakkavaladipani, a work on cosmology, c. 1520.
- Jinakalamali - A Thai Buddhist Chronicle, by a Thai elder named Ratapañña (16th century)
- Sangitivamsa - A Thai Chronicle, focusing on the various Buddhist councils (sangiti) from the 18th century
- Dhammavibhāga, by Vajirañāṇavarorasa (19th century)
- Navakovāda, by Vajirañāṇavarorasa (19th century)
- Vinayamukha, by Vajirañāṇavarorasa (19th century)

== See also ==
- Early Buddhist Texts
- Pāli Canon
- Sutta Piṭaka
- Vinaya Piṭaka
- Abhidhamma Piṭaka
- Anupitaka
- Pali Text Society
- Palm-leaf manuscript
- List of Pali Canon anthologies
- List of suttas
