= Atthakatha =

Commentaries on the Pāli Canon

Aṭṭhakathā
- OpenTipitaka
- Type: Commentarial texts Paracanonical texts
- Parent: Pāli literature
- Commentary on: Tipiṭaka
- Ṭīkā: Ṭīkā
- Abbreviation: -A; -a

Translations of Atthakatha
- Pali: Atthakatha
- Burmese: အဋ္ဌကထာ
- Korean: 논장
- Sinhala: අටුවා
- Thai: อรรถกถา
- Vietnamese: Chú giải

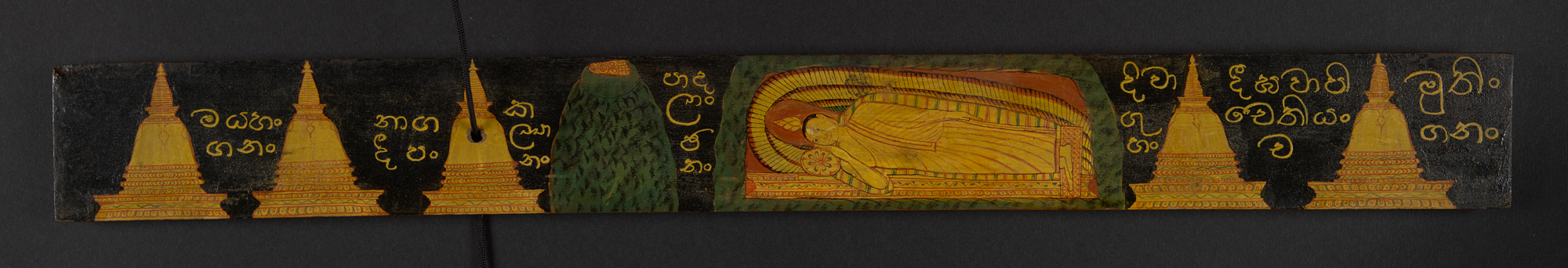
Front cover of the Palm-leaf manuscript containing bi-lingual Atthakatha, with Pali text and Sinhalese translation. Sri Lanka, 1853, British Library Oriental Manuscripts 6603/258.

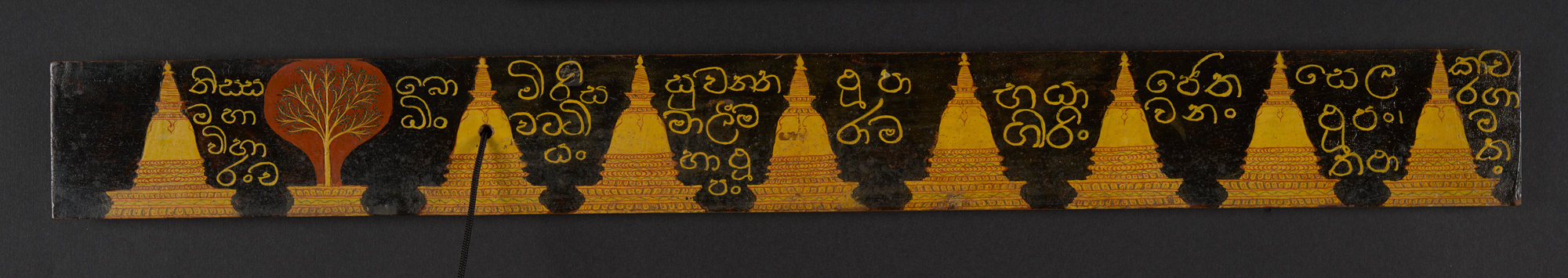
Back cover of the Palm-leaf manuscript containing bi-lingual Atthakatha, with Pali text and Sinhalese translation. Sri Lanka, 1853, British Library Oriental Manuscripts 6603/258.

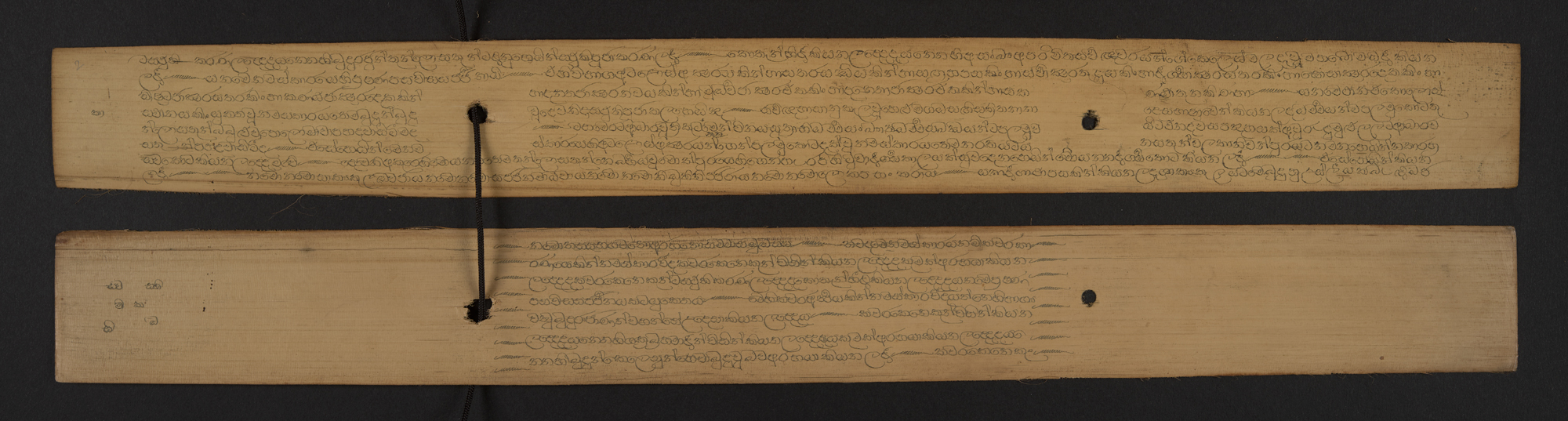
Palm-leaf manuscript containing bi-lingual Atthakatha, with Pali text and Sinhalese translation. Sri Lanka, 1756. British Library

Aṭṭhakathā (Pali for 'explanation', 'commentary') refers to Pali-language Theravadin Buddhist commentaries to the canonical Theravadin Tipitaka. These commentaries give the traditional interpretations of the scriptures. The major commentaries were based on earlier ones, now lost, in Prakrit and Sinhala, which were written down at the same time as the Canon, in the last century BCE. Some material in the commentaries is found in canonical texts of other schools of Buddhism, suggesting an early common source.

According to K.R. Norman:

There is no direct evidence that any commentarial material was in fact recited at the first council, but there is clear evidence that some parts of the commentaries are very old, perhaps even going back to the time of the Buddha, because they afford parallels with texts which are regarded as canonical by other sects, and must therefore pre-date the schisms between the sects. As has already been noted, some canonical texts include commentarial passages, while the existence of the Old Commentary in the Vinaya-pitaka and the canonical status of the Niddesa prove that some sort of exegesis was felt to be needed at a very early stage of Buddhism.

As with the Canon itself, the contents of collected editions of the Theravadin commentaries, compiled from the fourth century CE onwards, vary between editions. The minimal collection, found in the Thai edition (1992) includes the following (Skilling 2002).

- Twelve commentaries ascribed to Buddhaghosa: commentary on the Vinaya Pitaka; commentary on the Sutta Pitaka :- one each on the Digha Nikaya, Majjhima Nikaya, Samyutta Nikaya and Anguttara Nikaya; four on Khuddaka Nikaya books; and three on the Abhidhamma Pitaka.
- Commentaries by Dhammapala on seven books of the Khuddaka Nikaya.
- Four commentaries by various authors on four other books of the Khuddaka Nikaya.

In addition, the following are included in one or both of the other two editions: the Burmese Chatthasangayana edition (a list of contents can be found in Thein Han 1981) and the Sinhalese Simon Hewavitarne Bequest edition.

- The Patimokkha (Pruitt & Norman 2001, page xxxvi) and its commentary Kankhavitarani, ascribed to Buddhaghosa
- Commentary by Dhammapala on the Nettipakarana, a work sometimes included in the canon.
- Vinayasangaha, a selection of passages from Samantapasadika arranged topically by Sariputta in the twelfth century (Crosby 2006).
- Saratthasamuccaya, commentary on the Paritta. In Sinhalese (Malalasekera 1938).

In addition, there are treatises like Buddhaghosa's Visuddhimagga, a systematic presentation of the traditional teaching. This work, noted in both Sinhalese (Mori et al. 1994) and Burmese traditions, is sometimes loosely referred to as a "commentary" on the first four nikāyas for the material it details, although it is not traditionally considered as an "Aṭṭhakathā" (see Pakaranavisesa).

== Buddhaghosa ==
Below is a listing of fourth- or fifth-century CE commentator Buddhaghosa's fourteen alleged commentaries (Pāli: atthakatha) on the Pāli Tipitaka (Norman 1983).

Pali Tipitaka			Commentary
from the Vinaya Pitaka	Vinaya (general)		Samantapāsādikā
from the Vinaya Pitaka	Patimokkha		Kaṅkhāvitaraṇī or Māṭikaṭṭhakathā
from the Sutta Pitaka	Digha Nikaya		Sumaṅgalavilāsinī
from the Sutta Pitaka	Majjhima Nikaya		Papañcasūdani
from the Sutta Pitaka	Samyutta Nikaya		Sāratthappakāsinī
from the Sutta Pitaka	Anguttara Nikaya		Manorathapūraṇī
from the Sutta Pitaka	from the Khuddaka; Nikaya	Khuddakapatha	Paramatthajotikā (I)
from the Sutta Pitaka	from the Khuddaka; Nikaya	Dhammapada	Dhammapada-aṭṭhakathā
from the Sutta Pitaka	from the Khuddaka; Nikaya	Sutta Nipata	Paramatthajotikā (II), or Suttanipāta-aṭṭhakathā
from the Sutta Pitaka	from the Khuddaka; Nikaya	Jataka	Jātaka-aṭṭhavaṇṇā, or Jātaka-aṭṭhakathā
from the Abhidhamma; Pitaka	Dhammasangani		Aṭṭhasālinī
from the Abhidhamma; Pitaka	Vibhanga		Sammohavinodanī
from the Abhidhamma; Pitaka	Dhatukatha		Pañcappakaṇaraṭṭhakathā
from the Abhidhamma; Pitaka	Puggalapannatti		Pañcappakaṇaraṭṭhakathā
from the Abhidhamma; Pitaka	Kathavatthu		Pañcappakaṇaraṭṭhakathā
from the Abhidhamma; Pitaka	Yamaka		Pañcappakaṇaraṭṭhakathā
from the Abhidhamma; Pitaka	Patthana		Pañcappakaṇaraṭṭhakathā

Only the Visuddhimagga and the commentaries on the first four nikayas are accepted by a consensus of scholars as Buddhaghosa's.

== Dhammapala ==
The commentator Dhammapala's date is uncertain. He wrote after Buddhaghosa, and probably no later than the 7th century. His Khuddaka Nikaya commentaries are Paramatthadipani comprising :

- Udana-atthakatha regarding the Udana.
- Itivuttaka-atthakatha regarding the Itivuttaka.
- Vimanavatthu-atthakatha regarding the Vimanavatthu.
- Petavatthu-atthakatha regarding the Petavatthu.
- Theragatha-atthakatha regarding the Theragatha.
- Therigatha-atthakatha regarding the Therigatha.
- Cariyapitaka-atthakatha regarding the Cariyapitaka.

== Other Khuddaka Nikaya commentaries ==
Other Khuddaka Nikaya commentaries are :

- Saddhammapajotika by Upasena regarding the Niddesa.
- Saddhammappakasini by Mahānāma (or Mahābhidhana) regarding the Patisambhidamagga.
- Visuddhajanavilasini by an unknown author regarding the Apadana.
- Madhuratthavilasini attributed to Buddhadatta regarding the Buddhavamsa.

Three books are included in some editions of the Khuddaka Nikaya: Nettipakarana, Petakopadesa and Milindapañha. Of these only the Nettipakarana has a commentary in any standard edition.

== Translations ==
- Samantapasadika
  - Introduction translated as "The inception of discipline" by N. A. Jayawickrama, in 1 volume with the Pali, "Vinaya nidana", 1962, PTS, Oxford.
  - Chinese adaptation called Shan chien p'i p'o sha tr P. V. Bapat & Akira Hirakawa, Bhandarkar Oriental Research Institute, Poona.
- Patimokkha tr K. R. Norman, 2001, PTS, Oxford.
- Kankhavitarani: translation by K. R. Norman & William Pruitt in preparation.
- Sumangalavilasini (parts)
  - Introduction translated in a learned journal in the 1830s.
  - Commentary on Brahmajala Sutta, abr tr Bodhi in The All-Embracing Net of Views, BPS, Kandy, 1978. Available for free download here
  - Commentary on Samannaphala Sutta, abr tr Bodhi in The Discourse on the Fruits of Recluseship, BPS, Kandy, 1989. Available for free download here.
  - Commentary on Maha Nidana Sutta, abr tr Bodhi in The Great Discourse on Causation, BPS, Kandy, 1984. Available for free download here.
  - Commentary on Mahaparinibbana Sutta tr Yang-Gyu An, 2003, PTS, Oxford.
- Papancasudani (parts)
  - Commentary on Mulapariyaya Sutta, abr tr Bodhi in The Discourse on the Root of Existence, BPS, Kandy, 1980. Available for free download here.
  - Commentary on Sammaditthi Sutta, tr Nanamoli in The Discourse on Right View, BPS, Kandy, 1991. Available for free download. here
  - Commentary on Satipatthana Sutta, tr Soma in The Way of Mindfulness, Saccanubodha Samiti, Kandy, 1941; reprinted BPS, Kandy. Available for free download @here.
- Sāratthappakāsānī (Commentary for Samyuttanikāya).
  - Bojjhaṅgasaṃyutta and Indriyasaṃyutta in the Mahāvagga by Aggācāra Dhamma.
- Manorathapurani (parts): stories of leading nuns and laywomen, tr Mabel Bode in Journal of the Royal Asiatic Society, new series, volume XXV, pages 517-66 & 763–98
- Paramatthajotika on Khuddakapatha, tr Nanamoli as "The illustrator of ultimate meaning", in 1 volume with "The minor readings" (Khuddakapatha), 1960, PTS, Oxford.
- Dhammapada commentary, translated in two parts.
  - Stories giving background to verses, tr E. W. Burlingame as Buddhist Legends, 1921, 3 volumes, Harvard Oriental Series; reprinted PTS, Oxford.
  - Explanations of verses, translated in the Dhammapada translation by John Ross Carter & Mahinda Palihawadana, Oxford University Press, 1987; included only in the hardback edition, not the paperback World Classics edition.
- Udana commentary tr Peter Masefield, 1994–5, 2 volumes, PTS, Oxford.
- Itivuttaka commentary tr Peter Masefield, 2008–2009, 2 vols., PTS, Oxford.
- Vimanavatthu commentary, tr Peter Masefield as Vimana Stories, 1989, PTS, Oxford.
- Petavatthu commentary, tr U Ba Kyaw & Peter Masefield as Peta-Stories, 1980, PTS, Oxford.
- Theragatha commentary: substantial extracts translated in Psalms of the Brethren, tr C. A. F. Rhys Davids, 1913; reprinted in Psalms of the Early Buddhists, PTS, Oxford.
- Therigatha commentary, tr as The Commentary on the Verses of the Theris, by William Pruitt, 1998, PTS, Oxford.
- Jataka commentary.
  - Introduction tr as The Story of Gotama Buddha by N. A. Jayawickrama, 1990, PTS, Oxford.
  - Most of the rest is translated in the Jataka translation by E. B. Cowell et al., 1895–1907, 6 volumes, Cambridge University Press; reprinted in 3 volumes by PTS, Oxford.
- Paṭisambhidāmagga's commentary- second section: Saddhammmappakāsinī - Annotated Translation on the Section of Yuganaddha translated by Dr. Thiri Nyunt; third section: Annotated Translation on Paññāvagga by Ven. Dr. Cālā Therī.
- Madhuratthavilasini, tr as The Clarifier of the Sweet Meaning by I. B. Horner, 1978, PTS, Oxford.
- Atthasalini, tr as The Expositor by Pe Maung Tin, 1920–21, 2 volumes; reprinted in 1 volume, PTS, Oxford.
- Sammohavinodani, tr as The Dispeller of Delusion, by Nanamoli, 1987–91, 2 volumes, PTS, Oxford.
- Kathavatthu commentary, tr as The Debates Commentary by B. C. Law, 1940, PTS, Oxford.
- Visuddhimagga
  - The Path of Purity, tr Pe Maung Tin, 1923–31, 3 volumes; reprinted in 1 volume, Pali Text Society, Oxford.
  - The Path of Purification, tr Nanamoli, Ananda Semage, Colombo, 1956; reprinted Buddhist Publication Society, Kandy, Sri Lanka. Available for free download here.

== See also ==
- Anupiṭaka
- Buddhaghosa
- Dhammapala
- List of Pali Canon anthologies
- Pali Canon
- Pali literature
- Subcommentaries, Theravada
- Tripiṭaka

== Sources ==
- Crosby, Kate (2006). In Journal of the Pali Text Society, volume XXVIII.
- Hinüber, Oskar von (1996). Handbook of Pali Literature. Berlin: Walter de Gruyter. ISBN 3-11-014992-3.
- Malalasekera, G.P. (1938). Dictionary of Pali Proper Names, volume II. London: John Murray for the Government of India. ISBN 0-8288-1721-9.
- Mori, Sodo, Y Karunadasa & Toshiichi Endo (1994). Pali Atthakatha Correspondence Table. Oxford: Pali Text Society.
- Norman, K.R. (1983). Pali Literature, Wiesbaden: Otto Harrassowitz.
- Pruitt, William & K.R. Norman (2001). The Patimokkha, Oxford, Pali Text Society
- Rhys Davids, T.W. & William Stede (eds.) (1921–5). The Pali Text Society's Pali–English Dictionary. Chipstead: Pali Text Society. A general on-line search engine for the PED is available at http://dsal.uchicago.edu/dictionaries/pali/. Accessed 2007-05-09.
- Skilling, Peter (2002). In Journal of the Pali Text Society, volume XXVII.
- Thein Han, U (1981). In The Light of the Dhamma. Online at .
