= Abhidhamma Piṭaka =

Third division of the Tripitaka or Pali Canon of Theravada Buddhism

- SuttaCentral; OpenTipitaka
- Type: Canonical collection
- Parent: Tipiṭaka
- Contains: Dhammasaṅgaṇī; Vibhaṅga; Dhātukathā; Puggalapaññatti; Kathāvatthu; Yamaka; Paṭṭhāna
- Aṭṭhakathā: Aṭṭhasālinī; Sammohavinodanī; Pañcapakaraṇa
- Ṭīkā: Dhammasaṅgaṇī-mūlaṭīkā; Vibhaṅga-mūlaṭīkā; Pañcapakaraṇa-mūlaṭīkā; Dhammasaṅgaṇī-anuṭīkā; Pañcapakaraṇa-anuṭīkā; Abhidhammāvatāra; Nāmarūpapariccheda; Abhidhammatthasaṅgaha; Abhidhammatthavibhāvinīṭīkā; Abhidhammāvatāra-purāṇaṭīkā; Abhidhammamātikā
- Abbreviation: Abhidhamma; Abh; Ab

The Abhidhamma Piṭaka (English: Basket of Higher Doctrine; Vietnamese: Tạng Vi diệu Pháp) is the third of the three divisions of the Pali Tripitaka, the definitive canonical collection of scripture of Theravada Buddhism. The other two parts of the Tripiṭaka are the Vinaya Piṭaka and the Sutta Piṭaka.

The Abhidhamma Piṭaka is a detailed scholastic analysis and summary of the Buddha's teachings in the Suttas. Here the suttas are reworked into a schematized system of general principles that might be called 'Buddhist Psychology'. In the Abhidhamma, the generally dispersed teachings and principles of the suttas are organized into a coherent science of Buddhist doctrine. The Abhidhamma Pitaka is one of several surviving examples of Abhidharma literature, analytical and philosophical texts that were composed by several of the early Buddhist schools of India. One text within the Abhidhamma Pitaka addresses doctrinal differences with other early Buddhist schools. Study of the Abhidhamma Pitaka and Theravāda Abhidhamma is a traditional specialty pursued in depth by some Theravada monks. The Abhidhamma Pitaka is also an important part of Theravada Buddhist liturgy that is regularly recited at funerals and festivals.

== Etymology and overview ==
Abhi means "higher" and dhamma here refers to the teaching of the Buddha. Thus Abhidhamma constitutes the 'Higher Teaching' of the Buddha. According to the two truths doctrine the Buddha adapted his teaching according to the level of education, intellectual capacity and level of spiritual development of those whom he came into contact with. The bulk of what the Buddha taught was aimed towards a class of human being he referred to as puthujjana. These were essentially ordinary people engaged in worldly pursuits.

In the words of the Buddhist scholar Narada Mahathera: 'The Dhamma, embodied in the Sutta Pitaka, is the conventional teaching (Pali: vohāra desanā), and the Abhidhamma is the ultimate teaching (Pali: paramattha desanā)'.

== Origins ==
Tradition holds that the Buddha thought out the Abhidhamma immediately after his enlightenment then taught it to the gods some years later. Later, the Buddha repeated it to Sariputta who then transmitted it to his disciples. This tradition is evident in the Parivara, a late text from the Vinaya Pitaka, which mentions in a concluding verse of praise to the Buddha that this best of creatures, the lion, taught the three pitakas.

Modern Western scholarship, however, generally dates the origin of the Abhidhamma Pitaka to sometime around the third century BCE, 100 to 200 years after the death of the Buddha. Therefore, the seven Abhidhamma works are generally claimed by scholars not to represent the words of the Buddha himself, but those of disciples and scholars. Abhidharma literature likely originated as elaboration and interpretation of the suttas, but later developed independent doctrines.

The earliest texts of the Pali Canon have no mention of the texts of the Abhidhamma Piṭaka. The Abhidhamma is also not mentioned in some reports of the First Buddhist Council, which do mention the existence of the texts of the Vinaya and either the five Nikayas or the four Agamas. Other accounts do include the Abhidhamma.

Rupert Gethin however suggests that important elements of Abhidharma methodology probably go back to the Buddha's lifetime. A. K. Warder and Peter Harvey both suggested early dates for the Matrikas on which most of the Abidhamma books are based. These matrika, or matrices, were taxonomic lists that have been identified as likely precursors to fully developed Abhidharma literature.

== Contents ==
The Abhidhamma Piṭaka consists of seven books:

- Dhammasaṅgaṇī (-saṅgaṇi or -saṅgaṇī)
- Vibhaṅga (vibhaṅga)
- Dhātukathā (dhātukathā)
- Puggalapaññatti (-paññatti)
- Kathāvatthu (kathā-)
- Yamaka
- Paṭṭhāna (paṭṭhāna)

The Pāḷi Abhidhamma collection has little in common with the Abhidharma works recognized by other early Buddhist schools.

=== Dhammasaṅganī ===
The Dhammasaṅgani (Summary of Dharma) is a manual of ethics for monks. It begins with a mātikā (translated as matrix) which lists classifications of dhammas (translated as phenomena, ideas, states, etc.). The mātikā starts with 22 threefold classifications, such as good/bad/unclassified, and then follows with 100 twofold classifications according to the Abhidhamma method. Many of these classifications are not exhaustive, and some are not even exclusive. The mātikā ends with 42 twofold classifications according to the sutta method; these 42 are only used in the Dhammasaṅgani, whereas the other 122 are used in some of the other books as well.

The main body of the Dhammasaṅgani is in four parts. The first part goes through numerous states of mind, listing and defining by lists of synonyms, factors present in the states. The second deals with material form, beginning with its own mātikā, classifying by ones, twos and so on, and explaining afterwards. The third explains the book's mātikā in terms of the first two parts, as does the fourth, by a different method (and omitting the sutta method).

=== Vibhaṅga ===
The Vibhanga (Division or Classification) consists of 18 chapters, each dealing with a different topic. For example, the first chapter deals with the five aggregates. A typical chapter consists of three parts. The first of these parts explains the topic according to the sutta method, often word-for-word as in actual suttas. The second is Abhidhamma explanation, mainly by lists of synonyms as in the Dhammasaṅgani. The third employs questions and answers, based on the mātikā, such as "How many aggregates are good?"

=== Dhātukathā ===
The Dhātukathā (Discussion of Elements) covers both the matika and various topics, mostly from the Vibhaṅga, relating them to the 5 aggregates, 12 bases and 18 elements. The first chapter is fairly simple: "In how many aggregates etc. are good dhammas etc. included?" The book progressively works up to more complicated questions: "From how many aggregates etc. are the dhammas dissociated from attention etc. dissociated?"

=== Puggalapaññatti ===
The Puggalapaññatti (Designation of Person) starts with its own mātikā, which begins with some standard lists but then continues with lists of persons grouped numerically from ones to tens. This latter portion of the mātikā is then explained in the main body of the work. It lists human characteristics encountered on the stages of a Buddhist path. Most of the lists of persons and many of the explanations are also found in the Anguttara Nikaya.

=== Kathāvatthu ===
The Kathāvatthu (Points of Controversy) consists of more than two hundred debates on questions of doctrine. The questions are heretical in nature, and are answered in such a way as to refute them. It starts with the question of whether or not a soul exists. It does not identify the participants. The commentary says the debates are between the Theravāda and other schools, which it identifies in each case. These identifications are mostly consistent with what is known from other sources about the doctrines of different schools. It is the only portion attributed to a specific author, Moggaliputta.

=== Yamaka ===
The Yamaka (Pairs) consists of ten chapters, each dealing with a different topic; for example, the first deals with roots. A typical chapter (there are a number of divergences from this pattern) is in three parts. The first part deals with questions of identity: "Is good root root?" "But is root good root?" The entire Yamaka consists of such pairs of converse questions, with their answers. Hence its name, which means pairs. The second part deals with arising: "For someone for whom the form aggregate arises, does the feeling aggregate arise?" The third part deals with understanding: "Does someone who understands the eye base understand the ear base?" In essence, it is dealing with psychological phenomena.

=== Paṭṭhāna ===
The Paṭṭhāna (Activations or Causes) deals with 24 conditions in relation to the matika: "Good dhamma is related to good dhamma by root condition", with details and numbers of answers. This Paṭṭhāna text comprise many cause and effects theory detail expositions, limitation and unlimitation of to their direction depended nature with ultimate.

== Place in the tradition ==
The importance of the Abhidhamma Pitaka in classical Sinhalese Buddhism is suggested by the fact that it came to be furnished, not only, like much of the canon, with a commentary and a subcommentary on that commentary, but even with a subsubcommentary on that subcommentary. In more recent centuries, Burma has become the main centre of Abhidhamma studies. However, all of Southeast Asia and Sri Lanka hold it in high regard. The Abhidhamma Pitika or its summaries are commonly chanted at Theravada funeral ceremonies.

=== Myanmar (Burma) ===
In Myanmar, the full Abhidhamma—especially the five volumes of the Paṭṭhāna—is ritually chanted for protection. The Paṭṭhāna, which details the interrelated causes of mental and physical phenomena, is viewed as a symbol of the Buddha's omniscience and a safeguard for his teachings. It is widely believed to protect against all dangers, appease gods, and repel evil spirits. Because of its intense nature, it is often paired with the Karaṇīyamettā Sutta, a loving-kindness chant, to provide balance and relief. The final book of the Abhidhamma Pitaka, the Patthana, is chanted continuously for seven days and nights at an annual festival in Mandalay.

=== Cambodia, Laos, and Thailand ===
In Thailand, an abridged version of the Abhidhamma Piṭaka from The Royal Chanting Book is chanted at funerals to aid the deceased's transition to the next life. Abhidhamma texts composed in Thailand in the 15th and 16th centuries continued to be preached to lay audiences until the early 20th century. Condensed versions of the seven books of the Abhidhamma Pitaka are some of the most common texts found in Thai and Khmer manuscript collections. A survey conducted in the early 20th Century by Louis Finot found that the Abhidhamma Pitaka was the only one of the three Pitakas possessed in complete form by most Laotian monasteries.

== See also ==
- Abhidhammāvatāra
- Access to Insight
- Buddhist Publication Society
- Dhamma Society Fund
- List of suttas
- Pali Text Society
- Pariyatti (bookstore)
