= Paṭṭhāna =

Buddhist scripture

- SuttaCentral Paṭṭhāna OpenTipitaka: Paṭṭhāna 1; Paṭṭhāna 2; Paṭṭhāna 3; Paṭṭhāna 4; Paṭṭhāna 5
- Type: Canonical text
- Parent: Abhidhamma Piṭaka
- Attribution: Bhāṇaka
- Aṭṭhakathā: Pañcapakaraṇa-aṭṭhakathā (Paṭṭhānapakaraṇa-aṭṭhakathā)
- Commentator: Buddhaghosa
- Ṭīkā: Pañcapakaraṇamūlaṭīkā; Pañcapakaraṇa-anuṭīkā
- Abbreviation: Patthana; Paṭṭh

The Paṭṭhāna (Pali: paṭṭhāna, Sanskrit: prasthāna, Jñāna-prasthāna, Mahā-Pakaraṇa, Paṭṭhāna-Pakaraṇa, "Book of Causal Relationships") is a Buddhist scripture. It is the seventh and final text of the Abhidhamma Pitaka ("Basket of Higher Doctrine"), which is one of the "Tripiṭaka-Three Baskets" of canonical Theravada Buddhist texts collectively known as the Pali Canon.

The Paṭṭhāna consists of three divisions (Eka, Duka, and Tīka). It provides a detailed examination of causal conditioning, (the Buddhist belief that causality — not a Creator deity — is the basis of existence), analyzing the 24 types of conditional relations (paccaya) in relation to the classifications in the matika of the Dhammasangani. This book emphasizes the point that — apart from nirvana, which is absolute — all other phenomena are relative (dependently arisen) in one way or another.

The Paṭṭhāna is the most popular paritta (protective text) in Myanmar. In Burmese Buddhism, the scripture is ritually recited by monks and laypeople for protection, and Burmese Buddhists believe the Paṭṭhāna can guard against threats and dangers, please helpful gods, and ward off evil spirits.

== Etymology ==
The term Paṭṭhāna is derived from the Pali components pa (various) and ṭhāna (matters or conditions). Thus, Paṭṭhāna refers to the study of various conditional relations. Another name for the text is Anantanaya Samanta Paṭṭhāna—Anantanaya meaning "infinite methods" and Samanta meaning "adorned with completeness"—emphasizing the vast and comprehensive scope of the treatise. So "ananta-naya-samanta pattana" is an honourific which means "the prominent conditions with all-encompassing infinite methods".

== Origin ==
The Paṭṭhāna is one of the seven books of the Abhidhamma Pitaka in the Pali Canon. According to traditional accounts, following his enlightenment on the full moon of the month of Kason in the 103rd year of the Maha Sakkaraj, the Buddha contemplated the Abhidhamma in seclusion. From the 6th to the 13th day of the waxing moon in the month of Nayon, he is said to have meditated before a golden pavilion offered by celestial beings.

While contemplating the first six books of the Abhidhamma, his bodily radiance remained constant. However, upon reflecting on the final book, the Paṭṭhāna, six-colored rays of light are said to have emanated from him. This event inspired great reverence from the gods and Brahmās. According to the commentary tradition, upon hearing the exposition of the Paṭṭhāna, 80,000 celestial beings attained liberation, and 500 human monks reached arahantship.

== 24 conditional relations ==
According to the Paṭṭhāna dhamma, all corporeal and mental phenomena are dependent upon some combination of 24 possible conditions. These conditions or paccayas are:

1. Root condition (hetu paccaya): lobha (attachment), alobha (anti-attachment), dosa (aggressiveness), adosa (anti-aggressiveness or embrace), moha (ignorance) and amoha (wisdom), by being the six root or primitive causes, give rise to all thoughts and feelings.
2. Object condition (ārammana paccaya): external objects and their effects, such as light and sounds, are ones of the causes of thoughts and feelings by stimulating a person's sensations.
3. Predominance condition (adhipati paccaya): a few mental aspects, such as wish (chanda) and motivation (vīrya), are believed to be possible dominant causes in Buddhist Psychology because each of them can profoundly dominate the rest of the mental aspects at one time.
4. Proximity condition (anantara paccaya): each step or process of a vithi, a mental procedure in Buddhist psychology, happens in order. One of such steps is a subsequent cause that give rise to a following one.
5. Contiguity condition (samanantara paccaya): this point is sort of emphasis of the continuity between two successive steps of a vithi.
6. Conascence condition (sahajāta paccaya): the Pali word saha means "together" and jata means "rise (into existence)." Interpretations of this point can be in two main versions. In the more straightforward one, the conditions that arise together and give rise to particular effects together are simultaneous causes. In the broader sense, according to Abhidhamma, all the variety of physical or mental features are mere manifestations of a number of fundamental physical or mental principles, and hence all of the variety can be unified to a simple group.
7. Mutuality condition (aññamañña paccaya): in Abhidhamma, some mental and physical phenomena are inter-supportive causes that can give rise to one another.
8. Support condition (nissaya paccaya): if one or more processes or phenomena is attributed to a particular cause no matter whether the causality is direct or indirect, that cause is, in Abhidhamma, regarded as a responsible cause.
9. Decisive support condition (upanissaya paccaya): the modifier upa (strong) is added to nissaya (support). There are 3 subconditions under decisive support condition or upanissaya paccaya. These are:
  1. Decisive support by way of Object (ārammanupanissaya)
  2. Decisive support by way of Proximity (anantarupanissaya)
  3. Decisive support by way of Natural Condition (pakatupanissaya)
10. Prenascence condition (purejāta paccaya): a condition that has risen into its existence before an effect that it gives rise to, it is a pre-existing cause.
11. Postnascence condition (pacchājāta paccaya): a condition that rises into its existence after a phenomenon that it later supports or maintains, it is a post-existing cause.
12. Frequency condition (āsevana paccaya)
13. Karma condition (kamma paccaya): in Theravada Buddhism, the correct meaning of karma is basically a purposeful action. If a particular process or phenomena of a person is purposeful enough to cause a consequence (vipāka), it is called a karma causes.
14. Karma-result or consequence condition (vipāka paccaya)
15. Nutriment condition (āhāra paccaya): nutrition that serves as fuel or raw material in physiology is nutritious causes.
16. Faculty condition (indriya paccaya)
17. Jhāna condition (jhāna paccaya): a relation specific to meditation attainments
18. Path condition (magga paccaya): a relation specific to the stages on the Buddhist path
19. Association condition (sampayutta paccaya)
20. Dissociation condition (vippayutta paccaya)
21. Presence condition (atthi paccaya)
22. Absence condition (natthi paccaya)
23. Disappearance condition (vigata paccaya)
24. Non-disappearance condition (avigata paccaya)

All of these 24 conditions may in fact be reduced to only four conditions: Object (ārammana paccaya), Decisive support (upanissaya paccaya), Karma (kamma paccaya), and Presence (atthi paccaya).

== English translations ==
- Conditional Relations, 1969-, in progress, 2 volumes so far tr U Narada, Pali Text Society, Bristol

== Cited works ==
- Mahathera, Nyanatiloka, ed. (1983). "VII: Paṭṭhāna". Guide Through the Abhidhamma-Pitaka (PDF) (4th ed.). Kandy, Ceylon: Buddhist Publication Society. p. 117.
- Ronkin, Noa (2014). "Abhidharma". In Zalta, Edward N. (ed.). The Stanford Encyclopedia of Philosophy.
- Sarao, K.T.S. (2017). "Paṭṭhāna". In Sarao, K.T.S.; Long, Jeffery D. (eds.). Buddhism and Jainism. Encyclopedia of Indian Religions. Dordrecht: Springer Nature. pp. 881–883. doi:10.1007/978-94-024-0852-2_303. ISBN 978-9402408515.
