= Dhātukathā =

- SuttaCentral; OpenTipitaka
- Type: Canonical text
- Parent: Abhidhamma Piṭaka
- Attribution: Bhāṇaka
- Aṭṭhakathā: Pañcapakaraṇa-aṭṭhakathā (Dhātukathā-aṭṭhakathā)
- Commentator: Buddhaghosa
- Ṭīkā: Pañcapakaraṇamūlaṭīkā; Pañcapakaraṇa-anuṭīkā
- Abbreviation: Dt; Dhk; DhK

The Dhātukathā (Pali: dhātukathā; Vietnamese: Bộ Chất Ngữ) is a Buddhist scripture, part of the Pāli Canon of Theravāda Buddhism, where it is included in the Abhidhamma Piṭaka. This text is a key component of the Abhidhamma literature and serves as an important tool for the detailed analysis and understanding of the dhammas (phenomena) as outlined in earlier texts.

== Overview ==
=== Content and structure ===
The Dhātukathā combines and synthesizes ideas from the two preceding Abhidhamma books, the Dhammasaṅgaṇī and Vibhaṅga. It presents its material in the form of questions and answers, systematically arranged into 14 chapters. This methodical approach aids in the analytical study of the dhammas.

=== Analytical methodology ===
Each chapter in the Dhātukathā is dedicated to a specific line of inquiry regarding the nature of phenomena. The first chapter, for instance, asks of each item covered, "In how many aggregates, bases, and elements is it included?" This foundational question sets the stage for progressively more complex analyses in subsequent chapters. An example of a more advanced question is, "From how many aggregates, bases, and elements are the dhammas dissociated from the dhammas associated with it dissociated?"

=== Relation to Dhammasaṅgaṇī and Vibhaṅga ===
The Dhātukathā studies the dhammas analyzed in the Dhammasaṅgaṇī and Vibhaṅga from fourteen different perspectives of analytical investigation. These perspectives allow for a comprehensive examination of the interactions and distinctions between various dhammas. This multi-faceted analysis is crucial for a deeper understanding of the teachings of the Abhidhamma.

== Importance in tradition ==
The Dhātukathā is not merely a theoretical text but serves as a practical guide for the meditative and intellectual practices within Theravada Buddhism. Its detailed analysis helps practitioners to discern the intricacies of mental and physical phenomena, thereby aiding in the development of insight (vipassanā).

== Translations ==
The title "Dhātukathā" can be translated as "Discourse on Elements."

=== English ===
An English translation by U Narada was published in 1962 by the Pali Text Society, based in Bristol.
