= Pali Canon =

Buddhist scriptures of the Theravada tradition

Tipiṭaka
- SuttaCentral; OpenTipitaka
- Type: Canonical texts
- Parent: Pāli literature
- Contains: Vinaya Piṭaka; Sutta Piṭaka; Abhidhamma Piṭaka
- Aṭṭhakathā: Aṭṭhakathā
- Ṭīkā: Ṭīkā

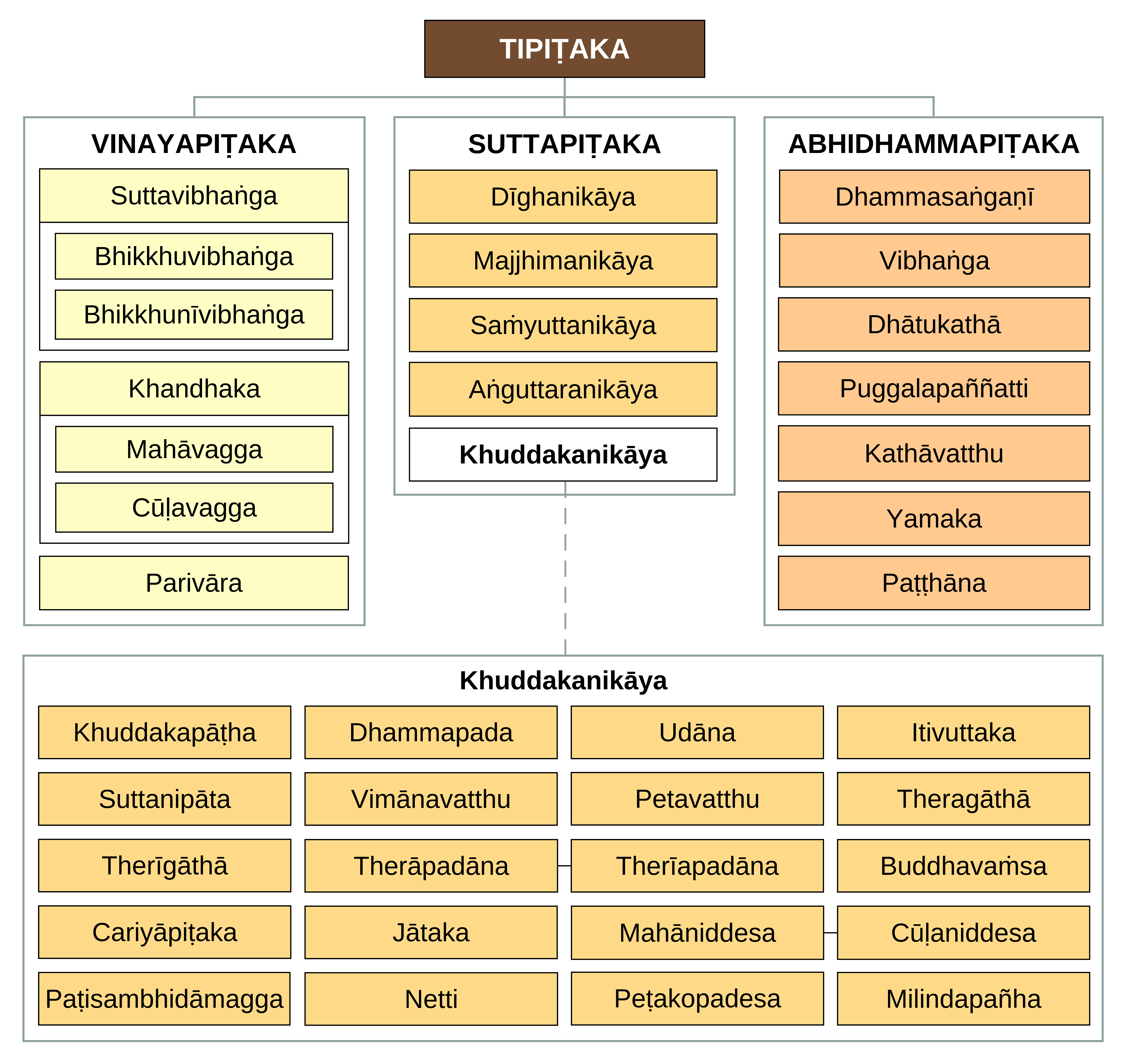
The structure of the books considered canonical within the Pali Tipitaka.

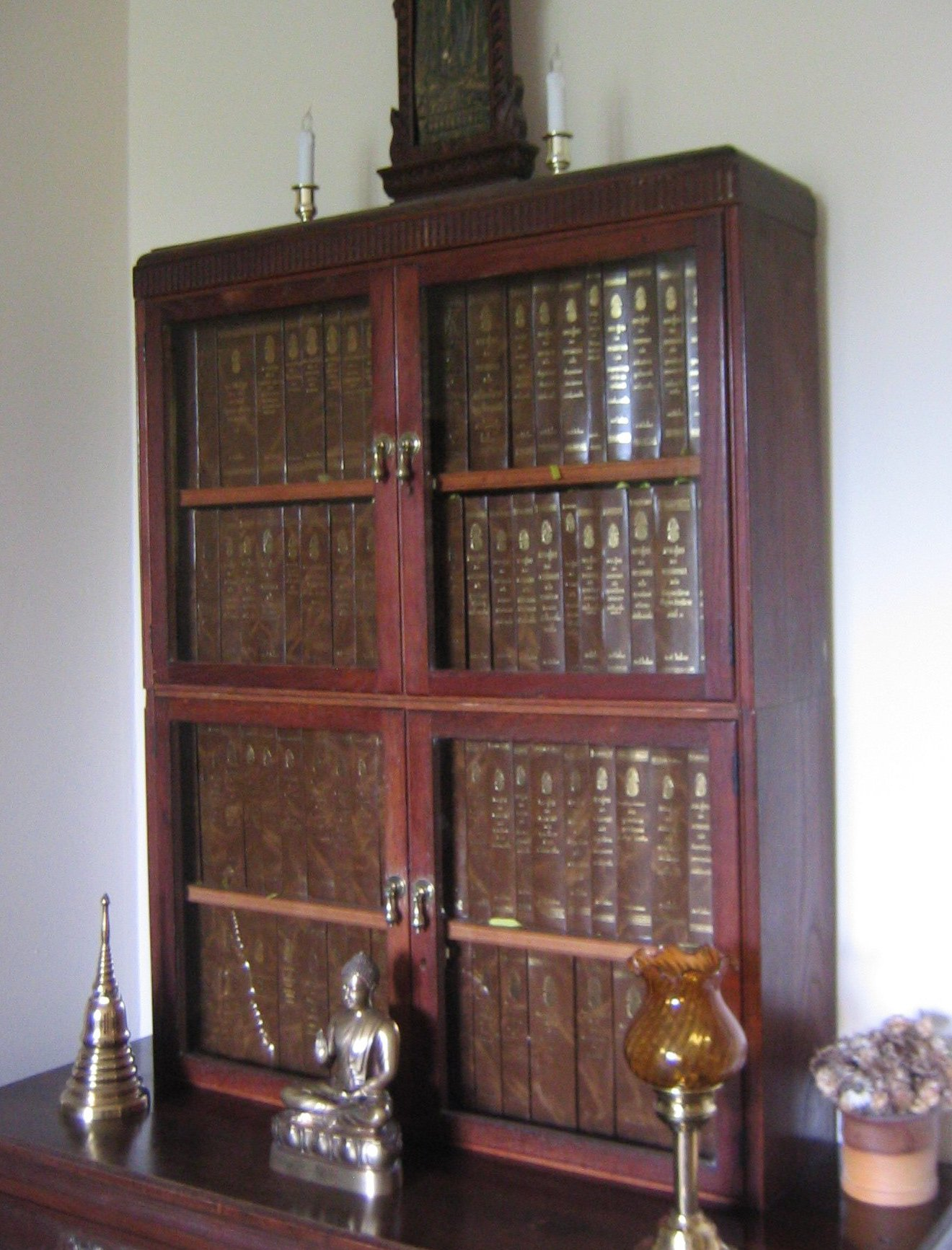
Standard edition of the Thai Pali Canon

The Pāḷi Canon is the standard collection of scriptures in the Theravada Buddhist tradition, as preserved in the Pāli language. It is the most complete extant early Buddhist canon. It derives mainly from the Tambapaṇṇiya school.

According to Buddhist tradition, during the First Buddhist Council, three months after the parinibbana of Gautama Buddha in Rajgir, Ananda recited the Sutta Pitaka, and Upali recited the Vinaya Pitaka. The Arhats present accepted the recitations, and henceforth, the teachings were preserved orally by the Sangha. The Tipitaka that was transmitted to Sri Lanka during the reign of King Asoka was initially preserved orally and later written down on palm leaves during the Fourth Buddhist Council in 29 BC, approximately 454 years after the death of Gautama Buddha. (Note: If the language of the Pāli Canon is north Indian in origin, and without substantial Sinhalese additions, it is likely that the canon was composed somewhere in north India before its introduction to Sri Lanka.) The claim that the texts were "spoken by the Buddha" is meant in this non-literal sense.

The existence of the Bhāṇaka tradition existing until later periods, along with other sources, shows that oral tradition continued to exist side by side with written scriptures for many centuries to come. Thus, the so-called writing down of the scriptures was only the beginning of a new form of tradition, and the innovation was likely opposed by the more conservative monks. As with many other innovations, it was only after some time that it was generally accepted. Therefore, it was much later that the records of this event were transformed into an account of a "council" (sangayana or sangiti) which was held under the patronage of King Vattagamani.

Textual fragments of similar teachings have been found in the Āgamas of other major Buddhist schools in India. They were, however, written down in various Prakrits other than Pali as well as Sanskrit. Some of those were later translated into Chinese (earliest dating to the late 4th century AD). The surviving Sri Lankan version is the most complete, but was extensively redacted about 1,000 years after Buddha's death, in the 5th or 6th-century CE. The earliest textual fragments of canonical Pali were found in the Pyu city-states in Burma dating only to the mid-5th to mid-6th century CE.

The Pāli Canon falls into three general categories, called pitaka (from Pali piṭaka, meaning "basket", referring to the receptacles in which the palm-leaf manuscripts were kept). Thus, the canon is traditionally known as the Tipiṭaka ("three baskets"). The three pitakas are as follows:

1. Vinaya Piṭaka ("Discipline Basket"), dealing with rules or discipline of the sangha
2. Sutta Piṭaka (Sutra/Sayings Basket), discourses and sermons of Buddha, some religious poetry; the largest basket
3. Abhidhamma Piṭaka, treatises that elaborate Buddhist doctrines, particularly about mind; also called the "systematic philosophy" basket

The Vinaya Pitaka and the Sutta Pitaka are remarkably similar to the works of the early Buddhist schools, often termed Early Buddhist Texts. The Abhidhamma Pitaka, however, is a strictly Theravada collection and has little in common with the Abhidhamma works recognized by other Buddhist schools.

== The Canon in the tradition ==
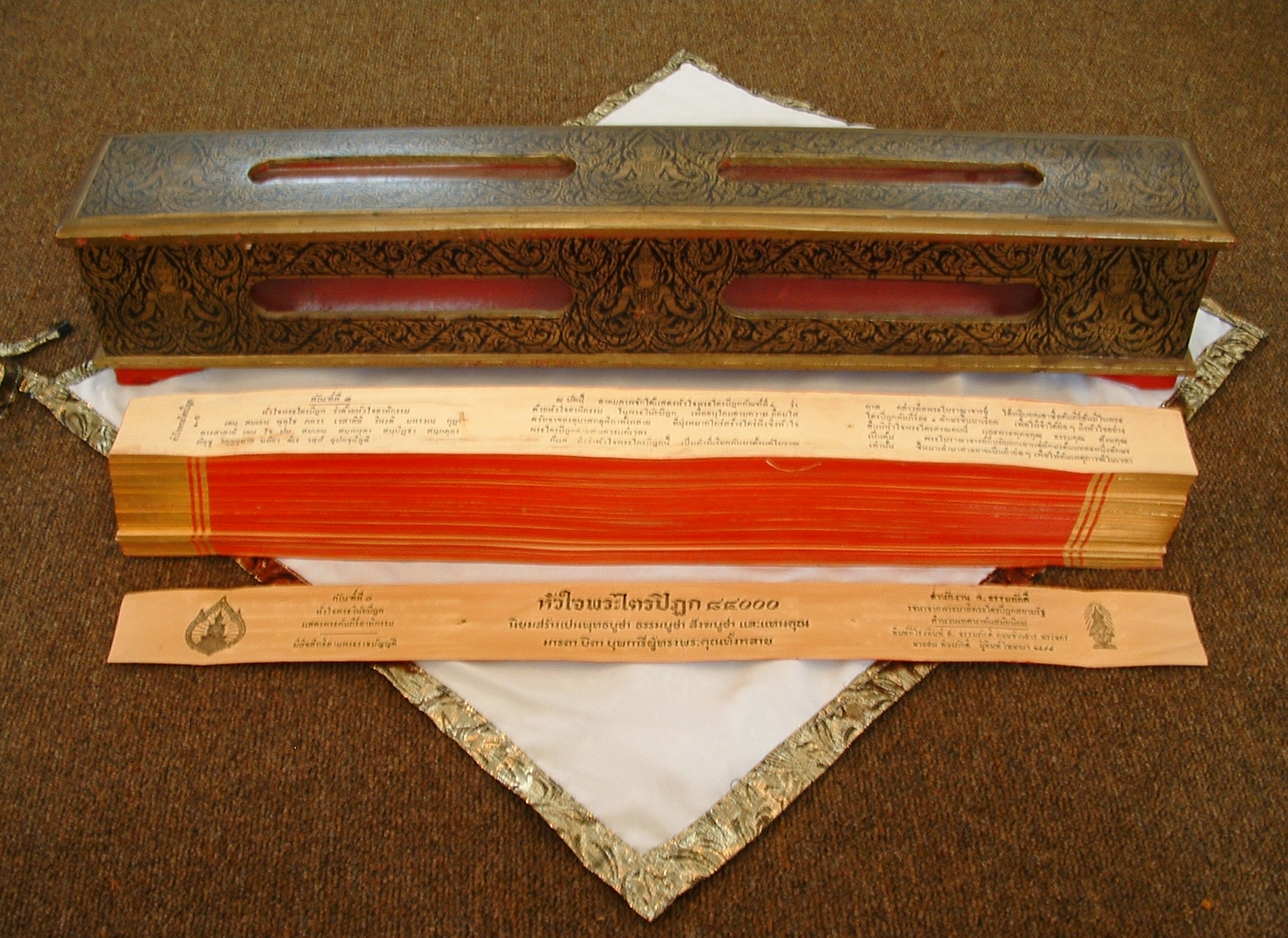
In pre-modern times the Pali Canon was disseminated through oral tradition and palm-leaf manuscripts. The leaves are kept together by thin sticks, and the scripture is covered in cloth and kept in a box.

The Canon is traditionally described by the Theravada as the Word of the Buddha (buddhavacana), though this is not intended in a literal sense, since it includes teachings by disciples.

The traditional Theravādin (Mahavihārin) interpretation of the Pali Canon is given in a series of commentaries covering nearly the whole Canon, compiled by Buddhaghosa (fl. 4th–5th century AD) and later monks, mainly on the basis of earlier materials now lost. Subcommentaries were written afterward, commenting further on the Canon and its commentaries. The traditional Theravādin interpretation is summarized in Buddhaghosa's Visuddhimagga.

A spokesman for the Buddha Sasana Council of Burma states that the Canon contains everything needed to show the path to nirvāna; the commentaries and subcommentaries sometimes include much speculative matter, but are faithful to its teachings and often give very illuminating illustrations.

Although the Canon has existed in written form for two millennia, its earlier oral nature has not been forgotten in Buddhist practice: memorization and recitation remain common. Among frequently recited texts are the Paritta. Even lay people usually know at least a few short texts by heart and recite them regularly; this is considered a form of meditation, at least if one understands the meaning. Monks are of course expected to know quite a bit more (see Dhammapada below for an example). A Burmese monk named Vicittasara even learned the entire Canon by heart for the Sixth Council (again according to the usual Theravada numbering).

The relation of the scriptures to Buddhism as it actually exists among ordinary monks and lay people is, as with other major religious traditions, problematic: the evidence suggests that only parts of the Canon ever enjoyed wide currency, and that non-canonical works were sometimes much more widely used; the details varied from place to place. Rupert Gethin suggests that the whole of Buddhist history may be regarded as a working out of the implications of the early scriptures.

== Origins ==
According to a late section of the Pali Canon, the Buddha taught the three pitakas. It is traditionally believed by Theravadins that most of the Pali Canon originated from the Buddha and his immediate disciples. According to the scriptures, a council was held shortly after the Buddha's passing to collect and preserve his teachings. The Theravada tradition states that the Canon was recited orally from the 5th century to the first century BC, when it was written down. The memorization was reinforced by regular communal recitations. The tradition holds that only a few later additions were made. The Theravādin pitakas were first written down in Sri Lanka in the Alu Viharaya Temple no earlier than 29–17 BC.

The geographic setting of identifiable texts within the Canon generally corresponds to locations in the Ganges region of northeastern India, including the kingdoms of Kosala, Kasi, Vajji, and Magadha. While Theravada tradition has generally regarded Pali as being synonymous with the language of the kingdom of Magadhi as spoken by the Buddha, linguists have identified Pali as being more closely related to other prakrit languages of western India, and found substantial incompatibilities with the few preserved examples of Magadhi and other north-eastern prakrit languages. Linguistic research suggests that the teachings of the Buddha may have been recorded in an eastern Indian language originally, and transposed into the west Indian precursor of Pali sometime before the Asokan era.

Much of the material in the Canon is not specifically Theravādin, but is instead the collection of teachings that this school preserved from the early, non-sectarian body of teachings. According to Peter Harvey, the Canon contains material which is at odds with later Theravādin orthodoxy. He states that "the Theravādins, then, may have added texts to the Canon for some time, but they do not appear to have tampered with what they already had from an earlier period." A variety of factors suggest that the early Sri Lankan Buddhists regarded canonical literature as such and transmitted it conservatively.

Theravada tradition generally treats the Canon as a whole as originating with the Buddha and his immediate disciples (with the exception of certain, generally Abhidhamma texts, that explicitly refer to events long after his death). Scholars differ in their views regarding the origin of the Pali Canon, but generally believe that the Canon includes several strata of relatively early and late texts, but with little consensus regarding the relative dating of different sections of the Canon or which texts belong to which era.

=== Authorship ===
==== Authorship according to Theravadins ====
Prayudh Payutto argues that the Pali Canon represents the teachings of the Buddha essentially unchanged apart from minor modifications. He argues that it also incorporates teachings that precede the Buddha, and that the later teachings were memorized by the Buddha's followers while he was still alive. His thesis is based on study of the processes of the first great council, and the methods for memorization used by the monks, which started during the Buddha's lifetime. It's also based on the capability of a few monks, to this day, to memorize the entire canon.

Bhikkhu Sujato and Bhikkhu Brahmali argue that it is likely that much of the Pali Canon dates back to the time period of the Buddha. They base this on many lines of evidence including the technology described in the canon (apart from the obviously later texts), which matches the technology of his day which was in rapid development; that it doesn't include back written prophecies of the great Buddhist ruler King Ashoka (which Mahayana texts often do) suggesting that it predates his time; that in its descriptions of the political geography it presents India at the time of Buddha, which changed soon after his death; that it has no mention of places in South India, which would have been well known to Indians not long after Buddha's death; and various other lines of evidence dating the material back to his time.

==== Authorship according to academic scholars ====
The views of scholars concerning the authorship of the Pali Canon can be grouped into three categories:

1. Attribution to the Buddha himself and his early followers
2. Attribution to the period of pre-sectarian Buddhism
3. Agnosticism

===== Views concerning authorship of the Buddha himself =====
Several scholars of early Buddhism argue that the nucleus of the Buddhist teachings in the Pali Canon may derive from Gautama Buddha himself, but that part of it also was developed after the Buddha by his early followers. Richard Gombrich says that the main preachings of the Buddha (as in the Vinaya and Sutta Pitaka) are coherent and cogent, and must be the work of a single person: the Buddha himself, not a committee of followers after his death. (Note: "I am saying that there was a person called the Buddha, that the preachings probably go back to him individually ... that we can learn more about what he meant, and that he was saying some very precise things.")

Other scholars are more cautious, and attribute part of the Pali Canon to the Buddha's early followers. Peter Harvey states that "much" of the Pali Canon must derive from the Buddha's teaching, but also that "parts of the Pali Canon clearly originated after the time of the Buddha." (Note: "While parts of the Pali Canon clearly originated after the time of the Buddha, much must derive from his teaching.") A.K. Warder stated that there is no evidence to suggest that the shared teaching of the early schools was formulated by anyone else than the Buddha and his immediate followers. (Note: "there is no evidence to suggest that it was formulated by anyone else than the Buddha and his immediate followers.") J.W. de Jong said it would be "hypocritical" to assert that we can say nothing about the teachings of earliest Buddhism, arguing that "the basic ideas of Buddhism found in the canonical writings could very well have been proclaimed by him [the Buddha], transmitted and developed by his disciples and, finally, codified in fixed formulas."

Alex Wynne said that some texts in the Pali Canon may go back to the very beginning of Buddhism, which perhaps include the substance of the Buddha's teaching, and in some cases, maybe even his words. (Note: "If some of the material is so old, it might be possible to establish what texts go back to the very beginning of Buddhism, texts which perhaps include the substance of the Buddha's teaching, and in some cases, maybe even his words".) He suggests the canon was composed soon after Buddha's parinirvana, but after a period of free improvisation, and then the core teachings were preserved nearly verbatim by memory. Hajime Nakamura writes that while nothing can be definitively attributed to Gautama as a historical figure, some sayings or phrases must derive from him.

===== Views concerning authorship in the period of pre-sectarian Buddhism =====
Most scholars agree there was a rough body of sacred literature that an early community maintained and transmitted. (Note: Ronald Davidson states, "most scholars agree that there was a rough body of sacred literature (disputed) that a relatively early community (disputed) maintained and transmitted.")

Much of the Pali Canon is found also in the scriptures of other early schools of Buddhism, parts of whose versions are preserved, mainly in Chinese. Many scholars have argued that this shared material can be attributed to the period of Pre-sectarian Buddhism. This is the period before the early schools separated in about the fourth or third century BC.

===== Views concerning agnosticism =====
Some scholars see the Pali Canon as expanding and changing from an unknown nucleus. Arguments given for an agnostic attitude include that the evidence for the Buddha's teachings dates from long after his death.

Some scholars of later Indian Buddhism and Tibetan Buddhism say that little or nothing goes back to the Buddha. Ronald Davidson has little confidence that much, if any, of surviving Buddhist scripture is actually the word of the historical Buddha. Geoffrey Samuel says the Pali Canon largely derives from the work of Buddhaghosa and his colleagues in the 5th century AD. Gregory Schopen argues that it is not until the 5th to 6th centuries AD that we have any definite evidence about the contents of the Canon. This position was criticized by A. Wynne. Bhikkhu Anālayo has published a detailed refutation of Gregory Schopen's arguments.

==== Authorship of the Abhidhamma Pitaka ====
Western scholarship suggests that the composition of the Abhidhamma Pitaka likely began around 300 BCE, but may have drawn on an earlier tradition of lists and rubrics known as "matrika". Traditional accounts include it among the texts recited at the First Buddhist Council and attribute differences in form and style to its composition by Sariputra.

=== The earliest books of the Pali Canon ===
Opinions differ on what the earliest books of the Canon are. The majority of Western scholars consider the earliest identifiable stratum to be mainly prose works, the Vinaya (excluding the Parivāra) and the first four nikāyas of the Sutta Pitaka, and perhaps also some short verse works such as the Suttanipata. However, some scholars, particularly in Japan, maintain that the Suttanipāta is the earliest of all Buddhist scriptures, followed by the Itivuttaka and Udāna. However, some of the developments in teachings may only reflect changes in teaching that the Buddha himself adopted, during the 45 years that the Buddha was teaching. (Note: "as the Buddha taught for 45 years, some signs of development in teachings may only reflect changes during this period.")

Scholars generally agree that the early books include some later additions. Aspects of these late additions are or may be from a much earlier period. Aspects of the Pali Canon, such as what it says about society and South Asian history, are in doubt because the Pali Canon was extensively redacted in the 5th- or 6th-century AD, nearly a thousand years after the death of the Buddha. Further, this redacted Pali Canon of Sri Lanka itself mentions that it was previously redacted towards the end of 1st-century BC. According to Early Buddhism scholar Lars Fogelin, the Pali Canon of Sri Lanka is a modified Canon and "there is no good reason to assume that Sri Lankan Buddhism resembles Early Buddhism in the mainland, and there are numerous reasons to argue that it does not."

Dr. Peter Masefield researched a form of Pali known as Indochinese Pali or "Kham Pali". It had been considered a degraded form of Pali, but Masefield states that further examination of texts will probably show it is an internally consistent Pali dialect. The reason for the changes is that some combinations of characters are difficult to write in those scripts. Masefield says records in Thailand state that upon the third re-introduction of Theravada Buddhism into Sri Lanka (The Siyamese Sect), large number of texts were also taken. When monastic ordination died out in Sri Lanka, many texts were lost also. Therefore the Sri Lankan Pali Canon had been translated first into Indo-Chinese Pali, and then, at least in part, back again into Pali.

One of the edicts of Ashoka, the "Calcutta-Bairat edict", lists several works from the canon which Ashoka considered advantageous. According to Alexander Wynne:

The general consensus seems to be that what Asoka calls Munigatha correspond to the Munisutta (Sn 207–221), Moneyasute is probably the second half of the Nalakasutta (Sn 699–723), and Upatisapasine may correspond to the Sariputtasutta (Sn 955–975). The identification of most of the other titles is less certain, but Schmithausen, following Oldenberg before him, identifies what Asoka calls the Laghulovada with part of a prose text in the Majjhima Nikaya, the Ambalatthika-Rahulovada Sutta (M no. 61).

This seems to be evidence that some of these texts were already fixed by the time of the reign of Ashoka (304–232 BC), which means that some of the texts carried by the Buddhist missionaries at this time might also have been fixed.

According to the Sri Lankan Mahavamsa, the Pali Canon was written down in the reign of King Vattagāmini (Vaṭṭagāmiṇi) (1st century BCE) in Sri Lanka, at the Fourth Buddhist council. Most scholars hold that little if anything was added to the Canon after this, though Schopen questions this.

== Texts ==
=== Manuscripts ===
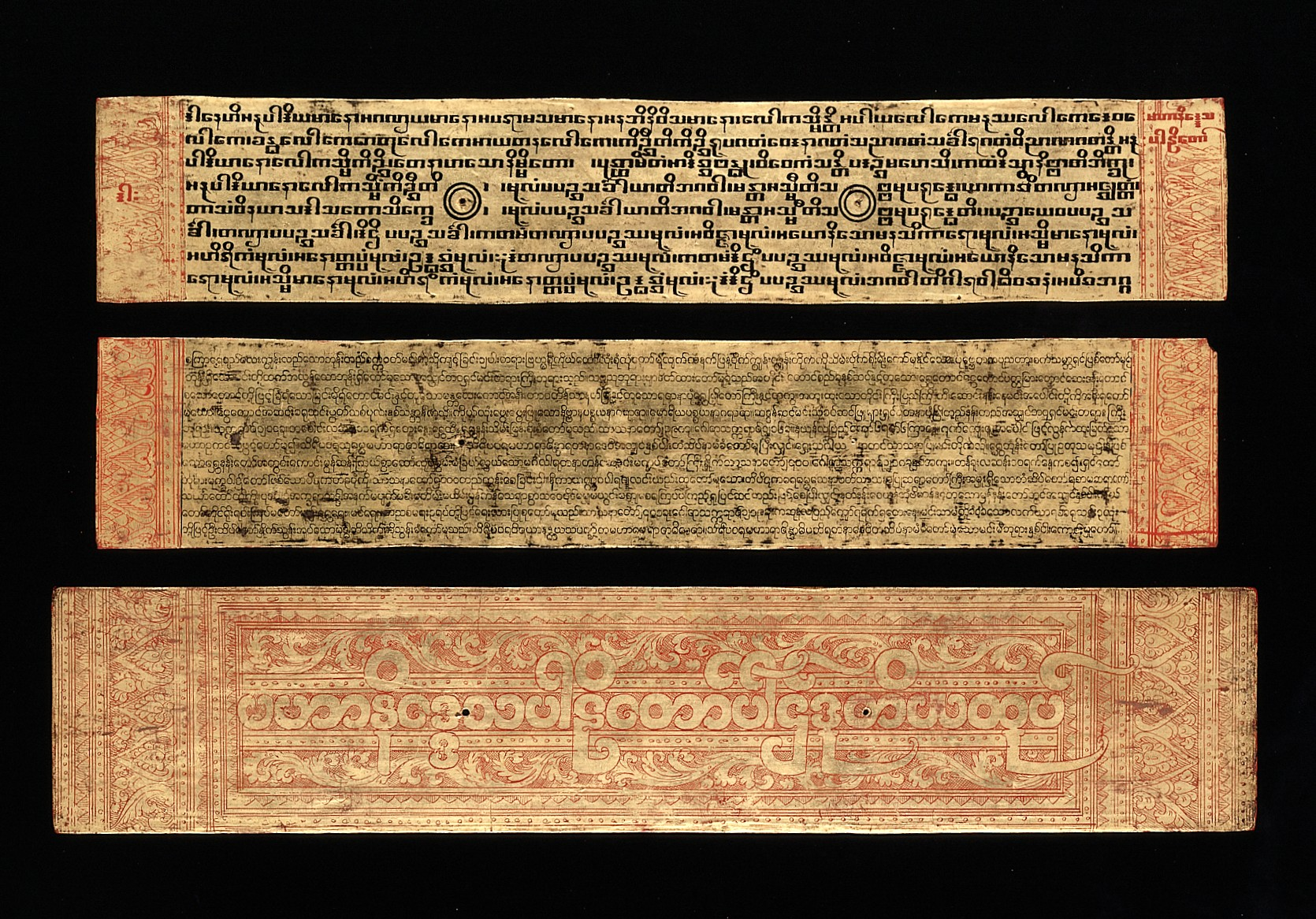
Burmese-Pali manuscript copy of the Buddhist text Mahaniddesa, showing three different types of Burmese script, (top) medium square, (centre) round and (bottom) outline round in red lacquer from the inside of one of the gilded covers

The climate of Theravāda countries is not conducive to the survival of manuscripts. Apart from brief quotations in inscriptions and a two-page fragment from the eighth or ninth century found in Nepal, the oldest manuscripts known are from late in the fifteenth century, and there is not very much from before the eighteenth.

=== Printed editions and digitized editions ===
The first complete printed edition of the Canon was published in Burma in 1900, in 38 volumes. The following editions of the Pali text of the Canon are readily available in the West:

- Pali Text Society edition (in Roman script), published 1877–1927 (a few volumes subsequently replaced by new editions), in 57 volumes (including indexes).
  - The Pali scriptures and some Pali commentaries were digitized as an MS-DOS/extended ASCII compatible database through cooperation between the Dhammakaya Foundation and the Pali Text Society in 1996 as PALITEXT version 1.0: CD-ROM Database of the Entire Buddhist Pali Canon ISBN 978-974-8235-87-5.
- Thai Tipitaka in Thai script, published during the reign of Rama VII (1925–35), 45 volumes, with fewer variant readings than PTS;
  - BUDSIR on Internet free with login; and electronic transcript by BUDSIR: Buddhist scriptures information retrieval, CD-ROM and online, both requiring payment.
- Sixth Council Tipiṭaka, Rangoon (1954–56), 40 volumes in Burmese script; with fewer variant readings than the Thai edition;
  - electronic transcript by Vipāssana Research Institute available online in searchable database free of charge, or on CD-ROM (p&p only) from the institute.
  - Another transcript of this edition, produced under the patronage of the Supreme Patriarch of Thailand, World Tipitaka Edition, 2005, 40 volumes, published by the Dhamma Society Fund, claims to include the full extent of changes made at the Sixth Council, and therefore reflect the results of the council more accurately than some existing Sixth Council editions. Available for viewing online (registration required) at Tipiṭaka Quotation WebService.
- Sinhalese (Buddha Jayanti) edition, (1957–1993?), 58 volumes including parallel Sinhalese translations, searchable, free of charge (not yet fully proofread.) Available at Journal of Buddhist Ethics. The only accurate version of the Sri Lankan text available, in individual page images. Cannot be searched though.
  - Transcript in BudhgayaNews Pali Canon. In this version it is easy to search for individual words across all 16,000+ pages at once and view the contexts in which they appear.
- Cambodian Tipiṭaka in Khmer script. Edited and published by the Institut Bouddhique in Phnom Penh (1931–69).
- Sipsongpanna Pattra Buddhist Canon as preserved by the Dai people.

== Translations ==
Pali Canon in English Translation, 1895-, in progress, 43 volumes so far, Pali Text Society, Bristol; for details of these and other translations of individual books see the separate articles. In 1994, the then President of the Pali Text Society stated that most of these translations were unsatisfactory. Another former President said in 2003 that most of the translations were done very badly. The style of many translations from the Canon has been criticized as "Buddhist Hybrid English", a term invented by Paul Griffiths for translations from Sanskrit. He describes it as "deplorable", "comprehensible only to the initiate, written by and for Buddhologists".

Selections: see List of Pali Canon anthologies.

A translation by Bhikkhu Nanamoli and Bhikkhu Bodhi of the Majjhima Nikaya was published by Wisdom Publications in 1995.

Translations by Bhikkhu Bodhi of the Samyutta Nikaya and the Anguttara Nikaya were published by Wisdom Publications in 2003 and 2012, respectively.

In 2018, new translations of the entirety of the five Nikayas were made freely available on the website suttacentral by the Australian Bhikkhu Sujato, the translations were also released into the Public domain.

A Japanese translation of the Canon, edited by Takakusu Junjiro, was published in 65 volumes from 1935 to 1941 as The Mahātripiṭaka of the Southern Tradition (南伝大蔵経 Nanden daizōkyō).

A Chinese translation of the above-mentioned Japanese translation was undertaken between 1990–1998 and thereafter printed under the patronage of Kaoshiung's Yuan Heng Temple.

== Contents of the Canon ==
As noted above, the Canon consists of three pitakas.

- Vinaya Pitaka (vinayapiṭaka)
- Sutta Pitaka or Suttanta Pitaka
- Abhidhamma Pitaka

Details are given below. For more complete information, see standard references on Pali literature.

=== Vinaya Pitaka ===
The first category, the Vinaya Pitaka, is mostly concerned with the rules of the sangha, both monks and nuns. The rules are preceded by stories telling how the Buddha came to lay them down, and followed by explanations and analysis. According to the stories, the rules were devised on an ad hoc basis as the Buddha encountered various behavioral problems or disputes among his followers. This pitaka can be divided into three parts:

- Suttavibhanga (-vibhaṅga) Commentary on the Patimokkha, a basic code of rules for monks and nuns that is not as such included in the Canon. The monks' rules are dealt with first, followed by those of the nuns' rules not already covered.
- Khandhaka Other rules grouped by topic in 22 chapters.
- Parivara (parivāra) Analysis of the rules from various points of view.

=== Sutta Pitaka ===
The second category is the Sutta Pitaka (literally "basket of threads", or of "the well spoken"; Sanskrit: Sutra Pitaka, following the former meaning) which consists primarily of accounts of the Buddha's teachings. The Sutta Pitaka has five subdivisions, or nikayas:

- Digha Nikaya (dīghanikāya) 34 long discourses. Joy Manné argues that this book was particularly intended to make converts, with its high proportion of debates and devotional material.
- Majjhima Nikaya 152 medium-length discourses. Manné argues that this book was particularly intended to give a solid grounding in the teaching to converts, with a high proportion of sermons and consultations.
- Samyutta Nikaya (saṃyutta-) Thousands of short discourses in fifty-odd groups by subject, person etc. Bhikkhu Bodhi, in his translation, says this nikaya has the most detailed explanations of doctrine.
- Anguttara Nikaya (aṅguttara-) Thousands of short discourses arranged numerically from ones to elevens. It contains more elementary teaching for ordinary people than the preceding three.
- Khuddaka Nikaya A miscellaneous collection of works in prose or verse.

=== Abhidhamma Pitaka ===
The third category, the Abhidhamma Pitaka (literally "beyond the dhamma", "higher dhamma" or "special dhamma", Sanskrit: Abhidharma Pitaka), is a collection of texts which give a scholastic explanation of Buddhist doctrines particularly about mind, and sometimes referred to as the "systematic philosophy" basket. There are seven books in the Abhidhamma Pitaka:

- Dhammasangani (-saṅgaṇi or -saṅgaṇī) Enumeration, definition and classification of dhammas
- Vibhanga (vibhaṅga) Analysis of 18 topics by various methods, including those of the Dhammasangani
- Dhatukatha (dhātukathā) Deals with interrelations between ideas from the previous two books
- Puggalapannatti (-paññatti) Explanations of types of person, arranged numerically in lists from ones to tens
- Kathavatthu (kathā-) Over 200 debates on points of doctrine
- Yamaka Applies to 10 topics a procedure involving converse questions (e.g. Is X Y? Is Y X?)
- Patthana (paṭṭhāna) Analysis of 24 types of condition

The traditional position is that abhidhamma refers to the absolute teaching, while the suttas are adapted to the hearer. Most scholars describe the abhidhamma as an attempt to systematize the teachings of the suttas: Cousins says that where the suttas think in terms of sequences or processes the abhidhamma thinks in terms of specific events or occasions.

== Use of Brahmanical language ==
The Pali Canon uses many Brahmanical terminology and concepts. For example, the Sundarika Sutta includes an analogy, quoted in several other places in the Canon, where the Buddha describes the Agnihotra as the foremost sacrifice and the Sāvitrī as the foremost meter:

aggihuttamukhā yaññā sāvittī chandaso mukham.

— Sacrifices have the agnihotra as foremost; of meter the foremost is the Sāvitrī.

These Brahmanical motives are sometimes introduced in order to "establish a link with the deeds and beliefs of Brahmins," referencing "shared ideas" that were part of the culture of ancient India. In many other instances, they are introduced in order to establish unfavorable comparisons with Buddhist teachings or practices- after identifying the fire sacrifice as the foremost of the Brahminist sacrifices, the Buddha goes on to explain how it is surpassed by the kindling of "inner light" that he practices as an arhat.

== Comparison with other Buddhist canons ==
The other two main Buddhist canons in use in the present day are the Chinese Buddhist Canon and the Tibetan Kangyur.

The standard modern edition of the Chinese Buddhist Canon is the Taishō Revised Tripiṭaka, with a hundred major divisions, totaling over 80,000 pages. This includes Vinayas for the Dharmaguptaka, Sarvāstivāda, Mahīśāsaka, and Mahāsaṃghika schools. It also includes the four major Āgamas, which are analogous to the Nikāyas of the Pali Canon. Namely, they are the Saṃyukta Āgama, Madhyama Āgama, Dīrgha Āgama, and Ekottarika Āgama. Also included are the Dhammapada, the Udāna, the Itivuttaka, and Milindapañha. There are also additional texts, including early histories, that are preserved from the early Buddhist schools but not found in Pali. The canon contains voluminous works of Abhidharma, especially from the Sarvāstivāda school. The Indian works preserved in the Chinese Canon were translated mostly from Buddhist Hybrid Sanskrit, Classical Sanskrit, or from regional Prakrits. The Chinese generally referred to these simply as "Sanskrit" (Ch. 梵語, Fànyǔ). The first woodblock printing of the entire Chinese Buddhist Canon was done during the Song dynasty by imperial order in China in AD 971; the earliest dated printed Buddhist sutra was the Diamond Sutra printed in AD 868 (printed by an upāsaka for free distribution); although printing of individual Buddhist sutras and related materials may have started as early as the 7th century AD.

The Tibetan Kangyur comprises about a hundred volumes and includes versions of the Vinaya Pitaka, the Dhammapada (under the title Udanavarga) and parts of some other books. Due to the later compilation, it contains comparatively fewer early Buddhist texts than the Pali and Chinese canons.

The Chinese and Tibetan canons are not translations of the Pali and differ from it to varying extents, but contain some recognizably similar early works. However, the Abhidharma books are fundamentally different works from the Pali Abhidhamma Pitaka. The Chinese and Tibetan canons also contain Mahāyāna sūtras and Vajrayāna tantras, which have few parallels in the Pali Canon. (Note: Most notably, a version of the Atanatiya Sutta (from the Digha Nikaya) is included in the tantra (Mikkyo, rgyud) divisions of the Taisho and of the Cone, Derge, Lhasa, Lithang, Narthang and Peking (Qianlong) editions of the Kangyur.)

== See also ==
- Access to Insight
- Atthakatha, Pali commentaries on the Pali Canon
- Aṭṭhakavagga and Pārāyanavagga
- Bhikkhu Analayo
- Bhikkhu Bodhi
- Buddhaghosa
- Buddhist Publication Society
- Dhamma Society Fund
- Dhammapada, one of the most widely read and best known Buddhist scriptures
- Dhammapāla
- Early Buddhist Texts
- Ho trai, library in Thai Temples
- Karl Eugen Neumann
- List of Sāsana Azani recipients
- Ñāṇamoli Bhikkhu
- Niddesa
- Nikāya
- Nyanaponika Thera
- Nyanatiloka Mahathera
- Pali Literature
- Pali Text Society
- Palm-leaf manuscript
- Paracanonical texts (Theravada Buddhism)
- Pariyatti (bookstore)
- Pitakataik
- Rerukane Chandawimala Thero
- Sacca-kiriya
- Sanam Luang Dhamma Studies
- Ṭhānissaro Bhikkhu
- Theravada Buddhism
- Thomas William Rhys Davids
- Tipitakadhara Tipitakakovida Selection Examinations
- Tripiṭaka tablets at Kuthodaw Pagoda

== Sources ==
- Allon, Mark (1997), "An Assessment of the Dhammakaya CD-ROM: Palitext Version 1.0", Buddhist Studies (Bukkyō Kenkyū), 26: 109–29
- Bechert, Heinz; Gombrich, Richard F. (1984), The world of buddhism: buddhist monks and nuns in society and culture, London: Thames and Hudson
- Buswell, Robert E (2004), Encyclopedia of Buddhism, USA: Macmillan Reference
- Cone, Margaret (2001), Dictionary of Pali, vol. I, Oxford: Pali Text Society
- Cousins, L. S. (1984), In Richard Gombrich and K. R. Norman (ed.): Dhammapala, Buddhist studies in honour of Hammalava Saddhatissa, Nugegoda, Sri Lanka: University of Sri Jayawardenapura, p. 56
- Cousins, L. S. (1982), Pali oral literature. In Denwood and Piatigorski, eds.: Buddhist Studies, ancient and modern, London: Curzon Press, pp. 1–11
- Davidson, Ronald M. (2003), Indian Esoteric Buddhism, New York: Indian Esoteric BuddhismColumbia University Press, ISBN 0-231-12618-2
- De Jong, J.W. (1993), "The Beginnings of Buddhism", The Eastern Buddhist, 26 (2): 25
- Encyclopædia Britannica (2008), "Buddhism", Encyclopædia Britannica
- Gethin, Rupert (1998), Foundations of Buddhism, Oxford; New York: Oxford University Press
- Gethin, Rupert (1992), The Buddha's Path to Awakening, Leiden: E. J. Brill
- Gombrich, Richard F (2006), Theravada Buddhism (2nd ed.), London: Routledge
- Griffiths, Paul J. (1981), "Buddhist Hybrid English: Some Notes on Philology and Hermeneutics for Buddhologists", Journal of the International Association of Buddhist Studies, 4 (2): 17–32
- Grönbold, Günter (1984), Der buddhistische Kanon: eine Bibliographie, Wiesbaden: Otto Harrassowitz
- Hamm (1973), In: Cultural Department of the German Embassy in India, ed., Varanasi: Chowkhamba Sanskrit Series Office, German Scholars on India, volume I
- Harvey, Peter (1995), The Selfless Mind, Surrey: Curzon Press
- Harvey, Peter (1990), Introduction to Buddhism, New York: Cambridge University Press
- Jones, Lindsay (2005), Councils, Buddhist. In: Encyclopedia of religion, Detroit: Macmillan Reference
- Maguire, Jack (2001), Essential Buddhism: A Complete Guide to Beliefs and Practices, Simon and Schuster, ISBN 978-0-671-04188-5
- Manné, Joy (1990), "Categories of sutta in the Pali Nikayas" (PDF), Journal of the Pali Text Society, XV: 29–88, archived from the original (PDF) on 2014-09-01
- McDaniel, Justin T. (2005), "The art of reading and teaching Dhammapadas: reform, texts, contexts in Thai Buddhist history", Journal of the International Association of Buddhist Studies, 28 (2): 299–336
- Mendelson, E. Michael (1975), Sangha and State in Burma, Ithaca, New York: Cornell University Press
- Morgan, Kenneth W. (1956), Path of the Buddha, New York: Ronald Press
- Nakamura, Hajime (1999), Indian Buddhism: A Survey with Bibliographical Notes, Delhi: Motilal Banarsidass
- Ñāṇamoli, Bhikkhu; Warder, Anthony Kennedy (1982), Introduction to Path of Discrimination, London: Pali Text Society: Distributed by Routledge and Kegan Paul
- Norman, K.R. (1983), Pali Literature, Wiesbaden: Otto Harrassowitz
- Norman, K.R. (1996), Collected Papers, volume VI, Bristol: Pali Text Society
- Norman, K.R. (2005). Buddhist Forum Volume V: Philological Approach to Buddhism. Routledge. pp. 75–76. ISBN 978-1-135-75154-8.
- Pali Canon Online Database, Bodhgaya News
- Samuel, Geoffrey (2012), Introducing Tibetan Buddhism, New York: Routledge
- Schopen, Gregory (1997), Bones, Stones, and Buddhist Monks, Honolulu: University of Hawai'i Press
- Skilling, P., ed. (1997). Mahasutras, volume I, Parts I & II. Oxford: Pali Text Society.
- Sri Lankan Pāḷi Texts, archived from the original on 2012-11-24
- "The Pali Tipitaka", Tipitaka.org
- "Vipassana Research Institute", Vri.dhamma.org, VRI Publications, archived from the original on 2012-10-14
- von Hinüber, Oskar (2000), A Handbook of Pāli Literature, Berlin; New York: Walter de Gruyter, ISBN 978-3-11-016738-2
- Warder, A. K. (1963), Introduction to Pali, London: Published for the Pali Text Society by Luzac
- Warder, A.K. (2000), Indian Buddhism, Buddhism Series (3rd ed.), Delhi: Motilal Banarsidass, ISBN 978-81-208-1741-8
- Wynne, Alexander (2003), How old is the Suttapiṭaka? The relative value of textual and epigraphical sources for the study of early Indian Buddhism (PDF), St John's College, archived from the original (PDF) on 2015-03-09
- Wynne, Alexander (2004). "The Oral Transmission of the Early Buddhist Literature". Journal of the International Association of Buddhist Studies. 27 (1): 97–128.
- Wynne, Alexander (2007), The origin of Buddhist meditation, New York: Routledge
