= Access to Insight =

Theravada Buddhist website

- Website type: Informational resource on Buddhism
- Website: accesstoinsight.org
- Commercial: No
- Launched: 1993

Access to Insight is a Theravada Buddhist website providing access to many translated texts from the Tipitaka, and contemporary materials published by the Buddhist Publication Society and many teachers from the Thai Forest Tradition.

== History ==
Access to Insight began in 1993 as a bulletin board system run by a volunteer with support from the Barre Center for Buddhist Studies. Originally, Access to Insight was one of several publishers of the results of the Dharma Net Dharma Book Transcription Project. As the internet grew in popularity compared to bulletin board services, ATI began to transition to a web-based format. In March 1995 the website became ATI's primary electronic presence; the BBS service was discontinued before the end of the year. In 1998, Access to Insight published a CD version of the website entitled A Handful of Leaves.

In the spring of 2005, the editor began The Dhamma Transcription Project, which formalizes transcription procedures that he had been following over the previous few years.

In October 2013 the editor announced changes to Access to Insight. On December 10, 2013, he announced his withdrawal from further personal contributions, but encouraged others to develop online tools for Dhamma studies. He said that his annual financial support of US$1,500 was to be discontinued and encouraged the future support and maintenance of a commercial-free search engine.

In September 2017 the Barre Center for Buddhist Studies assumed ownership of the domain name and management of the website.

== Content ==
All of the materials available on the ATI website are provided for free distribution. They remain protected by copyright, but may be copied and distributed if unmodified and without payment.

ATI contains texts from the Tipitaka, with an emphasis on conveying what are considered the fundamental ideas of Buddhist teaching, and teachings considered applicable to daily life. The majority of the canonical texts are drawn from the Sutta Pitaka, with others dealing with the Vinaya Pitaka, and little or nothing from the Abhidhamma Pitaka and the commentaries. ATI includes texts from the Pali Canon, many works published by the Buddhist Publication Society, and teachings translated from Thai by the Western-born Thanissaro Bhikkhu, abbot of the Metta Forest Monastery near San Diego, California, USA.

As of 2014 the materials available included over 900 sutta texts and several hundred books and articles, with translations and books contributed by a number of monks and lay scholars. Most texts are available in both HTML and plain text format.

== Use in Buddhist community ==
Access to Insight is well known to students of Buddhism around the world. For example, Thanissaro Bhikkhu, although he does not have Internet access, proclaims it as a valuable resource, and Pali scholar Bhikku Bodhi also recommends it. It has been cited in the Journal of Buddhist Ethics, Multi-Ethnic Children's Literature and Cross-Cultural Research.

It is also cited in several standard textbooks used in teaching Buddhism.
