= Yamaka =

Later Buddhist text that is part of the Pāli Abhidhamma Pitaka

- SuttaCentral Yamaka OpenTipitaka: Yamaka 1; Yamaka 2; Yamaka 3
- Type: Canonical text
- Parent: Abhidhamma Piṭaka
- Attribution: Bhāṇaka
- Aṭṭhakathā: Pañcapakaraṇa-aṭṭhakathā (Yamakapakaraṇa-aṭṭhakathā)
- Commentator: Buddhaghosa
- Ṭīkā: Pañcapakaraṇamūlaṭīkā; Pañcapakaraṇa-anuṭīkā
- Abbreviation: Ya

Yamaka (यमक; Pali for "pairs"; Vietnamese: Bộ Song Đối (Song Luận)) is a text of the Pali Canon, the scriptures of Buddhist monastic law. It is included in the Abhidhamma Pitaka and focuses on applied logic and analysis.

== Description ==
The term *Yamaka* means “pair,” as illustrated in the commentaries: for example, *Yamaka-pāṭihāriya* means “paired miracle,” and *Yamaka-sāla* means “paired sala tree,” etc.

The text explains key Dhamma principles clearly, specifying their meaning and scope, and tests understanding through paired, inverse questioning. For example, one might ask whether all wholesome dhammas are roots of wholesomeness, or whether all roots of wholesomeness are wholesome dhammas; whether all forms (rūpa) are form aggregates, or whether all form aggregates are forms; or whether all suffering (dukkha) is the truth of suffering (dukkhasacca), or vice versa.

The text consists of ten chapters, each dealing with a particular topic of Buddhist doctrine: roots (mūla), aggregates, sense bases (āyatana), elements (dhātu), truths (sacca), mental formations (saṅkhāra), latent tendencies (anusaya), mind (citta), dhammas (wholesome-unwholesome-neutral), and faculties (indriya). Its title ('pairs') stems from its method of treating topics by way of a thesis and antithesis: "Is all X Y? Does this imply that all Y is X?"

The Yamaka is divided into two volumes in some editions. In the first volume, seven principles are explained: roots (mūla, e.g., wholesome roots), aggregates (khandha), sense bases (āyatana), elements (dhātu), truths (sacca), mental formations (saṅkhāra), and latent tendencies (anusaya). Each paired discussion is called the Yamaka of that topic, e.g., Mūla-yamaka, Khandha-yamaka, etc. The second volume explains three principles: mind (citta), dhammas, and faculties (indriya), completing the ten Yamaka principles.

=== Content of the Ten Yamaka Chapters ===
1. Mūla-yamaka – Pairs of root Dhammas: wholesome, unwholesome, indeterminate, and mental Dhammas.
2. Khandha-yamaka – Pairs of aggregates (the five aggregates forming the person), analyzed in terms of definitions, occurrence, and realization.
3. Āyatana-yamaka – Pairs of sense bases (12 in total), analyzed in definition, occurrence, and realization.
4. Dhātu-yamaka – Pairs of elements, subdivided into 18 elements including sense organs, sense objects, types of consciousness, mind element, mind-consciousness element, and mental objects.
5. Sacca-yamaka – Pairs of truths (Four Noble Truths): suffering, origin, cessation, and path, analyzed in definition, occurrence, and realization.
6. Saṅkhāra-yamaka – Pairs of mental formations: bodily, verbal, and mental, analyzed in three parts.
7. Anusaya-yamaka – Pairs of latent tendencies, analyzed in seven ways: latent tendencies, those possessing them, abandonment, realization, eliminated tendencies, arising, and elemental nature.
8. Citta-yamaka – Pairs of mind, discussing characteristics, arising and passing, mind with defilements, and mind free from lust.
9. Dhamma-yamaka – Pairs of Dhammas: wholesome, unwholesome, indeterminate, analyzed in definition, occurrence, and arising.
10. Indriya-yamaka – Pairs of faculties, including 22 faculties such as the senses, mind, gender, life, happiness, suffering, faith, effort, mindfulness, concentration, wisdom, and knowledge of the Four Noble Truths, analyzed in three aspects.

=== Related Texts ===
- Yamaka-pakaraṇa-aṭṭhakathā – Commentary on the Yamaka by Buddhaghosa.
- Yamaka-mūlaṭīkā – Sub-commentaries such as Paramattha-pakāsinī by Ānanda Thera (6th–9th century).
- Yamaka-anuddīkā – Further sub-commentary, by Chulladhammapāla (6th–9th century).
- Yamaka-vaṇṇanāṭīkā – Commentary by Tilokguru, Sagaing, 17th century.
- Yamaka-yojanā – Commentary by Ñāṇakitti, Chiang Mai, 15th century.
