= Dhamma Society Fund =

Dhamma Society Fund, formally known as The M.L. Maniratana Bunnag Dhamma Society Fund under the Patronage His Holiness Somdet Phra Ñāṇasaṃvara the Supreme Patriarch of Thailand, is a charitable organisation in the Buddhist Theravāda Tradition, founded in 1997 by Thanpuying M.L. Manitatana Bunnag (1923–2000), Lady-in-Waiting to Her Majesty Queen Sirikit (1950–2000) and the Dhamma Society First Chairperson (1998–2000). Since 1999 the Dhamma Society Fund has undertaken the publication of the Tipiṭaka in Latin script, the World Edition. Recent activities focus on the Tipiṭaka, namely, organising Annual Tipiṭaka Lecture and Tipiṭaka presentation as a gift of Dhamma.

== Donations ==
In 2000, Dhamma Society made a donation of its private collection of very rare palm-leaves Pāḷi Tipiṭaka and Pāḷi Tipiṭaka Editions (first edition) in various national scripts as well as in translations (over 3000 items) to the Faculty of Arts, Chulalongkorn University, which are housed in the International Tipiṭaka Hall, Mahachulalongkorn Building, Chulalongkorn University in Bangkok.

== The World Tipiṭaka Project ==
Initiated in 1999 by the Dhamma Society upon a request from abroad to support the publication of the B.E. 2500 (1957) Great International Council Pāḷi Tipiṭaka Edition in Latin script. After a preliminary investigation of all the available electronic manuscripts, the Dhamma Society found that it was necessary to undertake anew the entire proof-reading and editing in Pāḷi language of the International Council Edition, both in printing and electronic formats. In 2004, the development of the electronic Pāḷi Tipiṭaka version was completed and was presented to Her Royal Highness Princess Galyani Vadhana, the Royal Matriarch of Thailand. In 2005, the printing project was finally completed and was published in Latin script in 40 volumes as a homage to the Buddha and in honour of the Buddhist Sovereign Monarchy of Thailand. For an inaugural presentation, HRH Princess Galyani Vadhana, as Honorary President and Royal Patron, led a historic 24-hour Pilgrimage by a special flight from Bangkok to Colombo to present the special inaugural edition as a royal gift of Dhamma to the President of the Democratic Socialist Republic of Sri Lanka on March 6, 2005. Two additional inaugural editions were graciously presented to the Constitutional Court of the Kingdom of Thailand and to the Carolina Rediviva, Uppsala University, Kingdom of Sweden. The special World Tipiṭaka Edition has since been presented to international institutions worldwide upon a formal request to the Princess Patron and World Tipiṭaka Committee.

== Publications ==
- The World Tipiṭaka Edition in Latin script, 40-volume set, hardcover, since 2005
- The Tipiṭaka Studies Reference, 40-volumes set, hardcover, since 2007
- The Chulachomklao of Siam Pāḷi Tipiṭaka : Digital Preservation Edition, 40-volume set, hardcover, since 2008
- Tipiṭaka Studies & Pilgrimage
- The World Tipiṭaka Recitation Edition
- Tipiṭaka Anthology
