= List of Pali Canon anthologies =

This list covers English-language anthologies essentially confined to the Pali Canon and including material from at least two pitakas. For more specialized selections see appropriate articles. For broader selections see Buddhist texts and Pali literature.

- Some Sayings of the Buddha, ed. & tr. F. L. Woodward, Oxford World Classics, 1924
- The Life of Gotama the Buddha, ed. E. H. Brewster, Kegan Paul, Trench, Trübner & Co., London, 1926
- Buddhist Scriptures, ed. & tr. E. J. Thomas, Wisdom of the East Series, John Murray, London, 1931
- The Vedantic Buddhism of the Buddha, ed. & tr. J. G. Jennings, Oxford University Press, London, 1947
- The Living Thoughts of Gotama the Buddha, ed. Ananda K. Coomaraswamy & I. B. Horner, Cassell, London, 1948
- The Buddha's Path to Deliverance: A Systematic Exposition in the Words of the Sutta Pitaka, ed. & tr. Nyanatiloka Thera, 1952. Available for free download here
- The Lion's Roar, ed. & tr. David Maurice, Rider, London, 1962
- The Life of the Buddha, ed. & tr. Nanamoli, Buddhist Publication Society, Kandy, Sri Lanka, 1972. Available for free download here
- The Wings to Awakening, ed. & tr. Thanissaro, 1996-2010 here
- In the Buddha's Words: An Anthology of Discourses from the Pali Canon, ed. & tr. Bhikkhu Bodhi, Wisdom Publications, 2005
- Early Buddhist Discourses, ed. & tr. John J. Holder, Hackett Publishing Company, Inc., Indianapolis, U.S.A., 2006
- Buddhist meditation, An anthology of texts from the Pali canon, tr. Sarah Shaw, Routledge, 2006
- Anguttara Nikaya Anthology: An anthology of discourses from the Anguttara Nikaya, Selected & Translated from the Pali, ed. & tr. Nyanaponika Thera & Bhikkhu Bodhi, Buddhist Publication Society, Kandy, Sri Lanka, 2007. Available for free download here
- Basic Teachings of the Buddha ed. & trans. Glenn Wallis. Modern Library: New York 2007.
- Sayings of the Buddha, ed. & tr. Rupert Gethin, Oxford University Press, New York, U.S.A., 2008
- A Taste of Salt ed. M. Breneman 2009. Available for free download here
- The Buddha's Teachings on Social and Communal Harmony: An Anthology of Discourses from the Pali Canon ed. & tr. Bhikkhu Bodhi, Wisdom Publications, 2016
