= Puggalapaññatti =

The Puggalapaññatti (IAST *Pudgalaprajñapti; Vietnamese: Bộ Nhân Chế Định) is a Buddhist scripture, part of the Pali Canon of Theravada Buddhism, where it is included in the Abhidhamma Pitaka.

This book deals with classifications of persons, which are arranged numerically, from 1-fold to 10-fold. It lists them at the beginning and then explains them.

== Translations ==
A Designation of Human Types, tr B. C. Law, 1922, Pali Text Society, Bristol

== See also ==
- Buddhist personality types
