= Sub-commentaries (Theravāda) =

Ṭīkā
- OpenTipitaka
- Type: Subcommentarial texts Paracanonical texts
- Parent: Pāli literature
- Commentary on: Aṭṭhakathā; Tipiṭaka
- Abbreviation: -Ṭ; -ṭ

The sub-commentaries (Pali: ṭīkā) are primarily commentaries on the commentaries (Pali: aṭṭhakathā) on the Pali Canon of Theravada Buddhism, written in Sri Lanka. This literature continues the commentaries' development of the traditional interpretation of the scriptures. These sub-commentaries were begun during the reign of Parākramabāhu I (1123–1186) under prominent Sri Lankan scholars such as Sāriputta Thera, Mahākassapa Thera of Dimbulagala Vihāra and Moggallāna Thera.

== Types of ṭīkā ==
Based on their hierarchy, chronological period, and scope, ṭīkā are traditionally classified into several contrasting pairs:

Based on hierarchy

- Mūla-ṭīkā, the original or root sub-commentary.
- Anu-ṭīkā, the additional or subsequent sub-commentary (sub-sub-commentary), which further explains the mūla-ṭīkā itself.

Based on chronology

- Porāṇa-ṭīkā or purāṇa-ṭīkā, the ancient sub-commentary (compiled during early periods).
- Abhinava-ṭīkā, the new or modern sub-commentary (compiled during later periods).

Based on scope

- Mahā-ṭīkā, the great or large sub-commentary (broad and extensive).
- Cūḷa-ṭīkā, the minor or small sub-commentary (concise and compact).
