= Pali Text Society =

Scholarly society (est. 1881)

- Abbreviation: PTS
- Founder: Thomas William Rhys Davids
- Headquarters: Bristol, Great Britain
- Coordinates: 51.4557°N 2.5824°W
- Publication: Journal of the Pali Text Society
- Website: palitextsociety.org

The Pali Text Society (Note: While the Pāli language is commonly written with a macron in scholarly literature, the PTS does not use it in its name; see "Talk" page for a longer explanation) is a text publication society founded in 1881 by Thomas William Rhys Davids "to foster and promote the study of Pāli texts." Pāli is the language in which the texts of the Theravada school of Buddhism are preserved. The Pāli texts are the oldest collection of Buddhist scriptures preserved in the language in which they were written down. The society first compiled, edited, and published Latin script versions of a large corpus of Pāli literature, including the Pāli Canon, as well as commentarial, exegetical texts, and histories. It publishes translations of many Pāli texts. It also publishes ancillary works including dictionaries, concordances, books for students of Pāli and the Journal of the Pali Text Society.

== History ==
=== 19th century beginnings ===
Thomas William Rhys Davids was one of three British civil servants who were posted to Sri Lanka, in the 19th century, the others being George Turnour, and Robert Caesar Childers (1838–1876). At this time Buddhism in Sri Lanka (then Ceylon) was struggling under the weight of foreign rule and intense missionary activity by Christians. It was an administrative requirement that all civil servants should be familiar with the language, literature, and culture of the land in which they were posted, so the three men studied with several scholar monks where, along with an introduction to Sinhala culture and language, they became interested in Buddhism.

The Pali Text Society was founded on the model of the Early English Text Society with Rhys Davids counting on support from a lot of European scholars and Sri Lankan scholar monks. The work of bringing out the Roman text editions of the Pāli Canon was not financially rewarding, but was achieved with the backing of the Buddhist clergy in Sri Lanka who underwrote the printing costs. Childers published the first Pāli-English dictionary in 1874.

=== 20th century ===
This was superseded in 1925 by the new dictionary which had largely been compiled by T. W. Rhys Davids over 40 years, but was finished by his student William Stede. Currently another dictionary is being compiled by Margaret Cone, with the first of three volumes (A - Kh) published in 2001.

By 1922, when T. W. Rhys Davids died, the Pali Text Society had issued 64 separate texts in 94 volumes exceeding 26,000 pages, as well a range of articles by English and European scholars.

The Pali Text Society signed an MoU between the Dhammakaya Foundation, Thailand, on 1996 for collaboration and published the entire PTS edition of the Pāli canon on CD-ROM.

=== Preservation of palm-leaf manuscripts ===
In 1994, the Pali Text Society inaugurated the Fragile Palm Leaves project, an attempt to catalogue and preserve Buddhist palm-leaf manuscripts from Southeast Asia. Prior to the introduction of printing presses and Western papermaking technology, texts in Southeast Asia—including the Pāli scriptures—were preserved by inscription on specially preserved leaves from palm trees. The leaves were then bound together to create a complete manuscript.

While palm-leaf manuscripts have likely been in use since before the 5th century CE, existing examples date from the 18th century and later, with the largest number having been created during the 19th century. Because of the materials used and the tropical climate, manuscripts from earlier eras are generally not found intact in palm-leaf form, and many manuscripts have been badly damaged. During the colonial era, many palm-leaf manuscripts were disassembled and destroyed, with individual pages of texts being sold as decorative objets d'art to Western collectors.

The Pali Text Society created the Fragile Palm Leaves project to collect, catalogue, and preserve these artifacts, including scanning them into electronic formats in order to make them available to researchers without threatening their preservation. In 2001 the project was formalised as a nonprofit in Thailand as the Fragile Palm Leaves Foundation.

In February 2013, the Pali Text Society, Sendai University, and the University of Toronto, along with local partners, began an ongoing initiative to digitise and catalogue Myanmar's palm-leaf manuscripts, including collections from U Pho Thi Library in Thaton, and Bagaya Monastery in Inwa. The digitised manuscripts are available at the open-access Myanmar Manuscript Digital Library.

== Mission ==
The Pali Text Society was founded with the goal of spreading the academic merit of Buddhism across Europe. It is a learned Society, dedicated not only to the translation of the Pāli Canon, but to the publication of a variety of Buddhist literature, the teaching of the Pāli language, and to spread their publications to libraries across Europe. The Pali Text Society, specifically its founder, Thomas William Rhys Davids, and his wife, Carolina Augusta Foyley Rhys Davids, have been attributed to creating the discipline of Buddhist studies. Scholar George D. Bond writes that the historical significance of the Davids’ family work, as well as the Society’s work, “contributes to a new understanding of the British Raj in India and Ceylon”. Furthermore, the Davids’s understood that not only did Buddhism in Sri Lanka hold a rich religious history, but that Pāli itself was the second oldest language East Asian religious texts had been recorded in, the first being the Vedanic tradition. The linguistic merit of Pāli was so culturally significant because, as Foyley writes, the language was “as dead as is Latin, and yet as alive, built out of old Indian dialects as the vehicle of the Canon…”.

== Thomas William Rhys Davids' contributions ==
The motivation for the formation of the Pali Text Society has its roots in Thomas William Rhys Davids’ Civil Service career. Since he had familial connections to ministry, and he received his education in Germany, studying both Greek and Sanskrit, Rhys Davids was employed by the British government to serve as an administrator in Sri Lanka from 1864 to 1872. During this decade of his career, Rhys Davids was posted in both Galle and Anuradhapura, Sri Lanka, serving as a clergyman, a judge, Secretary to Governor William Henry Gregory, and as Archeological Commissioner. According to scholarly reviews of his work by George D. Bond and Ananda Wickremeratne, Rhys Davids’ Civil Service work was dedicated to the process of Anglicization, and committed to “instilling English ideas of industry and liberty among people”. However, his wife, Carolina Foyley Rhys Davids, documents that her husband, despite both his familial and educational ties to the study of religion, was atheist, and that his fascination with Sri Lankan culture came from a place of greater academic cultural curiosity.

It was a common recurrence that members of the Anglican clergy would hold public debates against the Buddhists clergy and lay people alike of Sri Lanka. While these debates were intended to be demonstrations of Christian superiority, they actually increased the interest in Buddhism, both in the community and for Rhys Davids. From there, Rhys Davids went on to study the Pāli language and Sinhalese with Ceylon Monk, Yatramulle Sri Dhammarama. Dhammarama was the one who taught Rhys Davids of the Pāli Canon, on which he later dedicated his public career to, including the formation of the Pali Text Society. Although, in Europe during this period of time, Buddhist studies did not exist as an academic discipline, Rhys Davids sought to challenge Eurocentric ideas of Christian supremacy in order to argue in support of Buddhism as a valid religious area of knowledge. Despite his apparent atheism, as a scholar, Rhys Davids could appreciate faith through an understanding of uncovered knowledge. According to Foyley, Rhys Davids’ goal for the Pali Text Society was to “fructify the new attention that had just begun to be given to monastic libraries of ‘palm-leaf manuscripts.”

== The Contributions of Women to the Society: Carolina Augusta Foyley Rhys Davids ==
In Annals of the Bhandarkar Oriental Research Institute, Carolina Augusta Foyley Rhys Davids recounts how by 1936, the society was losing financial support due to the economic state of the country during The Great Depression. Following the passing of her husband, Thomas William Rhys Davids, in 1922, Foyley took over the Society’s president; like her husband, her career was in Buddhist Studies, and she was a scholar of both the Pāli language and Sanskrit. However, because Foyley’s educational background was in economics, she was the one that managed the Society’s finances, and furthermore, it was Foyley who helped pull the Society out of debt.

Foyley dedicated her entire career to completing the work of her late husband. Under her presidency, she was able to publish two editions of "Journal of the Pali Text Society", both which took roughly three years to complete. She also continued to work on the translations of the classic Pāli Texts, including two volumes on the translation of Apadāna, published by the Society in 1925 and 1927 respectively. A 1926 annual report, published in the second edition of The Journal of the Pali Text Society (1924-1927), reveals that the Society had recently published a new Pāli Dictionary to replace Robert Caesar Childers's, which Foyley quoted to be "antiquated and imperfect", the funding of which was provided by donors in Japan. In that same report, Foyley mentions how the publication of the new dictionary was one of the most costly expenses over the past three years, but how support from donations and subscriptions to the Society's works helped to keep the Society financially stable, both attributed to Foyley's economic genius.

The following is the subscription plan for the Pali Text Society, as Foyley records it in the 1926 report:

"The Subscription to the Society is One Guinea a year, for texts, or a text and Journals, and ten shillings a year for a translation, payable in advance.

Publications, two volumes a year, and, when possible, a translation, are sent post free on receipt of the subscription.

Back issues are sent post free on payment of the subscription for the year, or years, in which the volumes were issued (that is, of One Guinea a year or a proportional payment per volume). But the payment for issues dating prior to 1901 is now increased 50 per cent".

Upon acknowledging how little time she had left, she wrote in a diary entry "It is not likely I shall be here to finish to our work”, referring to the re-issuing of the original translations of Vinaya, Milinda, and Jataka. Foyley died in 1942, leaving the presidency of the Society to William Henry Denham Rouse.

== Presidents ==
Presidents of the Pali Text Society have included:

- 1881–1922: Thomas William Rhys Davids (1843–1922) (Founder)
- 1922–1942: Caroline Augusta Foley Rhys Davids (1857–1942)
- 1942–1950: William Henry Denham Rouse (1863–1950)
- 1950–1958: William Stede (1882–1958)
- 1959–1981: Isaline Blew Horner OBE (1896–1981)
- 1981–1994: Kenneth Roy Norman FBA (1925– 2020)
- 1994–2002: Richard Francis Gombrich (1937– )
- 2002–2003: Lance Selwyn Cousins (1942–2015)
- 2003–present: Rupert Mark Lovell Gethin (1957– )

=== The presidents' contribution to the Pali Text Society: ===
- Thomas William Rhys Davids founded the Pali Text Society in an effort to render Buddhist literature accessible to others. With the Pali Text Society and Dr. William Stede, Rhys Davids successfully finished the first Pāli dictionary.
- Caroline Augusta Foley Rhys Davids was almost able to complete the work of her husband, Thomas William Rhys Davids.
- William Stede co-authored the Pāli-English Dictionary with T.W. Rhys Davids.
- To celebrate her election as the new PTS president, Isaline Blew Horner produced a new translation of the Milindapañha to replace the one Rhys Davids made.
- Kenneth Roy Norman was on the Council of Pali Text Society for the longest out of everyone else.
