= Jataka tales =

Traditional narratives of the previous lives of Buddha

Translations of Jātaka tales
- English: Birth history
- Sanskrit: जातक (IAST: Jātaka)
- Bengali: জাতক (Jātak)
- Burmese: ဇာတက
- Khmer: ជាតក (UNGEGN: Chéadâk)
- Sinhala: ජාතක කථා (Jātaka Kathā)
- Thai: ชาดก (RTGS: Chadok)

In a previous life, as a woodpecker, the Buddha removes a bone from the throat of a lion, Amaravati style, c. 175–225 CE

The Jātaka (Sanskrit for "of the Birth", "Birth-Related" or "Birth Stories") are a voluminous body of literature native to the Indian subcontinent which mainly concern the previous births of Gautama Buddha in both human and animal form. Jataka stories were depicted on the railings and torans of the stupas. According to Peter Skilling, this genre is "one of the oldest classes of Buddhist literature." Some of these texts are also considered great works of literature in their own right. The various Indian Buddhist schools had different collections of jātakas. The largest known collection is the Jātakatthavaṇṇanā of the Theravada school, as a textual division of the Pāli Canon, included in the Khuddaka Nikaya of the Sutta Pitaka.

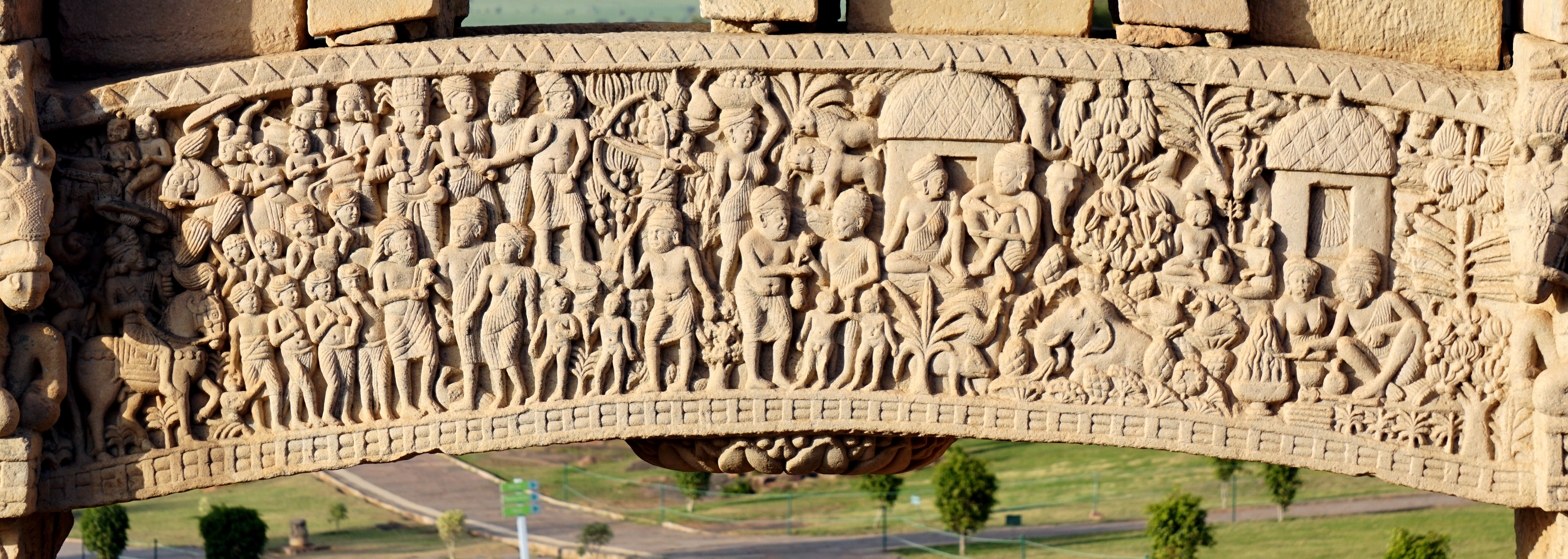
Vessantara Jataka, Sanchi

In these stories, the future Buddha may appear as a king, an outcaste, a deva, an animal—but, in whatever form, he exhibits some virtue that the tale thereby inculcates. Often, Jātaka tales include an extensive cast of characters who interact and get into various kinds of trouble – whereupon the Buddha character intervenes to resolve all the problems and bring about a happy ending. The Jātaka genre is based on the idea that the Buddha was able to recollect all his past lives and thus could use these memories to tell a story and illustrate his teachings.

For the Buddhist traditions, the jātakas illustrate the many lives, acts and spiritual practices which are required on the long path to Buddhahood. They also illustrate the great qualities or perfections of the Buddha (such as generosity) and teach Buddhist moral lessons, particularly within the framework of karma and rebirth. Jātaka stories have also been illustrated in Buddhist architecture throughout the Buddhist world and they continue to be an important element in popular Buddhist art. Some of the earliest such illustrations can be found at Sanchi and Bharhut.

According to Naomi Appleton, Jātaka collections also may have played "an important role formation and communication of ideas about buddhahood, karma and merit, and the place of the Buddha in relation to other buddhas and bodhisattvas." According to the traditional view found in the Pali Jātakanidana, a prologue to the stories, Gautama made a vow to become a Buddha in the future, in front of past Buddha Dipankara. He then spent many lifetimes on the path to Buddhahood, and the stories from these lives are recorded as Jātakas.

Jātakas are closely related to (and often overlap with) another genre of Buddhist narrative, the avadāna, which is a story of any karmically significant deed (whether by a bodhisattva or otherwise) and its result. According to Naomi Appleton, some tales (such as those found in the second and fourth decade of the Avadānaśataka) can be classified as both a jātaka and an avadāna.

== Overview ==
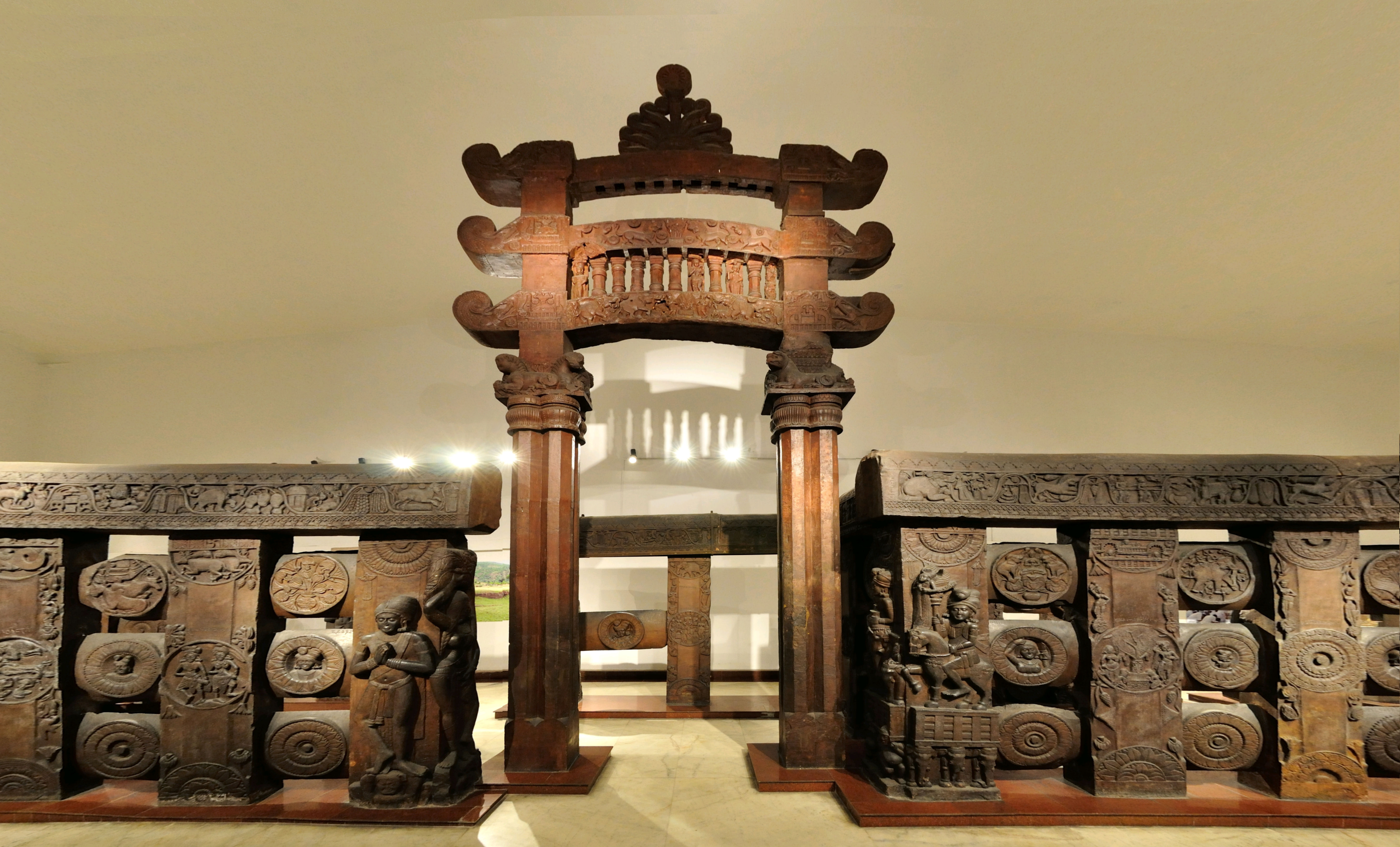
The railings of the Bharhut Stupa contain roundels with jātaka illustrations

=== Dating ===
Jātaka tales may be quite ancient. The term appears as part of a schema of Buddhist literary forms called the nine component genres of the Buddha's teaching (navaṅga-buddhasāsana), and depictions of them appear in early Indian art (as early as the second century BCE). They are also widely represented in ancient Indian inscriptions. According to Straube, "the presumably oldest specimens of fully elaborated narratives are dispersed throughout the Vinayapiṭakas and Sūtrapiṭakas of the canonical collections of the different Buddhist schools. These texts are transmitted in various Indian dialects and stem from a prior oral tradition."

Furthermore, while these texts cannot be dated in a precise manner, "the fact that many narratives are passed on in almost identical form within the canons of the different schools shows that they date back to the time before the schisms between the schools took place." Sarah Shaw, writing on the Pali Jātaka, states that the earliest part of the Jātaka, the verse portions, are "considered amongst the very earliest part of the Pali tradition and date from the fifth century BCE" while "the later parts were incorporated during the period up to the third century CE."

According to A. K. Warder, jātaka are the precursors to the various legendary biographies of the Buddha, which were composed at later dates. Although many jātaka were written from an early period, which describe previous lives of the Buddha, very little biographical material about Gautama's own life has been recorded. Jātaka tales also assimilate many traditional Indian fables and folklore that are not specifically Buddhist. As the genre spread outside of India, it also drew on local folk tales.

=== Literary features and themes ===
The Mahayana author Asaṅga provides a working definition of jātaka in his Śrāvakabhūmi:

What is jātaka? That which relates the austere practices and bodhisattva practices of the Blessed One in various past births: this is called jātaka.

The idea that jātaka are taught in order to illustrate the bodhisattva path is an ancient one and is contained in sources like the Mahavastu, which states: "the supreme ones [Buddhas], who are skilled in jātakas and other doctrines, teach the course of practice of a bodhisattva."

Many jātakas are told with a common threefold plot schema which contains:

- a "narrative in the present" (paccupannavatthu), with the Buddha and other figures,
- a "narrative in the past" (atītavatthu), a story from a past life of the Buddha
- a "link" (samodhāna) in which there is an "identification of the past protagonists with the present ones."

In the jātaka found in the Suttapitaka, which are almost always in prose, the Buddha is almost always depicted as a person of high rank in a past life (and not an animal). He is almost never portrayed as having been female. Some of these also include past lives of some of the Buddha's disciples. One famous example is the Pali Mahāparinirvāṇasūtra, which includes the story of Mahāsudarśana. Unlike Sutra collections, Vinaya sources like the Vinayavastu contain more varied jātakas, including ones in which the Buddha is depicted as an animal.

Many jātaka contain elements of both verse and prose. According to Martin Straube "the division into canonical verses and postcanonical prose points to the old Indian narrative form of ākhyāna, which has a fixed wording of the stanzas only, whereas the actual story is to be shaped anew during each oral performance." The plots of the jātaka range from simpler Aesopic style animal tales to longer more complex dramas which resemble epics or novels with intricate dialogue, characters and poetry. Despite the diversity of the plots and characters, they are all unified by the character of the heroic bodhisattva Gautama (whose identity is generally only revealed at the end of the story) and his struggles on the quest for awakening. In spite of this, Gautama is not always the central character of all these stories and sometimes only plays a minor role. Other recurring characters include important disciples of the Buddha, Devadatta (generally as a villain) and members of Gautama's family, like his wife Yasodharā and son Rāhula.

Another important element of the stories are the various Buddhist virtues, called perfections, that were cultivated by the bodhisattva Gautama throughout his previous lives, and which serve as the lessons taught by the jātakas. Other jātakas, such as those found in the Buddhavaṃsa (Chronicle of Buddhas), focus on Gautama's meeting, serving and venerating past Buddhas and serve to place his bodhisattva path in a chronology of past Buddhas. These stories generally focus on acts of devotion to past Buddhas and how this generates much merit which many positive outcomes in the future. A smaller number of jātakas illustrate various mistakes or bad actions that the bodhisattva committed in a past life (and the subsequent karmic retribution) and thus demonstrate the bodhisattva's past imperfections.

Regarding the intended audience of these texts, Martin Straube notes that even though there is a widespread view that jātakas arose due to monks "catering to the needs and tastes of the illiterate lay practitioners of Buddhism as propagandistic means of preaching or converting" there is no historical evidence for this. Instead, the opposite might be true, since "the prose portions of the Pali jātakas not infrequently have as their audience monks and nuns, who sometimes reach high levels of spiritual realization after listening to a jātaka story." Naomi Appleton, in her analysis of the second and fourth decade of the Avadānaśataka, notes that both sets of stories "assume a monastic audience." Likewise, Kate Crosby writes that "the format of the Jātaka in fact suggests that their original inclusion in the canonical collection was primarily for the benefit of monks." Crosby notes that many of these stories are connected with monastic behavior and decorum, some of them are also meant to illustrate specific rules in the Vinaya. In spite of this main intended audience, their simple format also made them easily adaptable for other uses. Thus, they were repackaged as artistic entertainment and teaching devices for laypersons, as parittas (protective chants) and as chronicle (vamsa) literature.

Straube also notes that the rock caves of Ajanta and Bagh were inhabited by monks and it was them who ordered and directed the jātaka murals found there. There is also evidence from inscriptions on old stūpas at various Indian sites (such as Sanchi and Bharhut) with jātaka motifs which indicate that they were built due to the patronage of monks and nuns, some of them of high rank such as bhāṇaka (reciter). Some scholars have also concluded that Jātaka reciters were part of their own division of reciters.

=== History ===
Jātakas were originally transmitted in prakrit languages and various forms of Sanskrit (from classical to Buddhist Hybrid Sanskrit). They were then translated into central Asian languages (such as Khotanese, Tocharian, Uighur, and Sogdian). Various jātaka stories and source texts were also translated into Chinese and Tibetan for the Tibetan and Chinese Buddhist canons. They were some of the first texts to be translated into Chinese. Kāng Sēnghuì (who worked in Nanking c. 247) was one of the first Chinese translators of Jātakas. Perhaps his most influential translation is the Scripture of the Collection of the Six Perfections.

The various Indian Buddhist schools had different collections of jātakas. The largest known collection is the Jātakatthavaṇṇanā of the Theravada school. In Theravada Buddhism, the Jātakas are a textual division of the Pāli Canon, included in the Khuddaka Nikaya of the Sutta Pitaka. The term Jātaka may also refer to a traditional commentaries (Atthakatha) on this book. The tales are dated between 300 BCE and 400 CE.

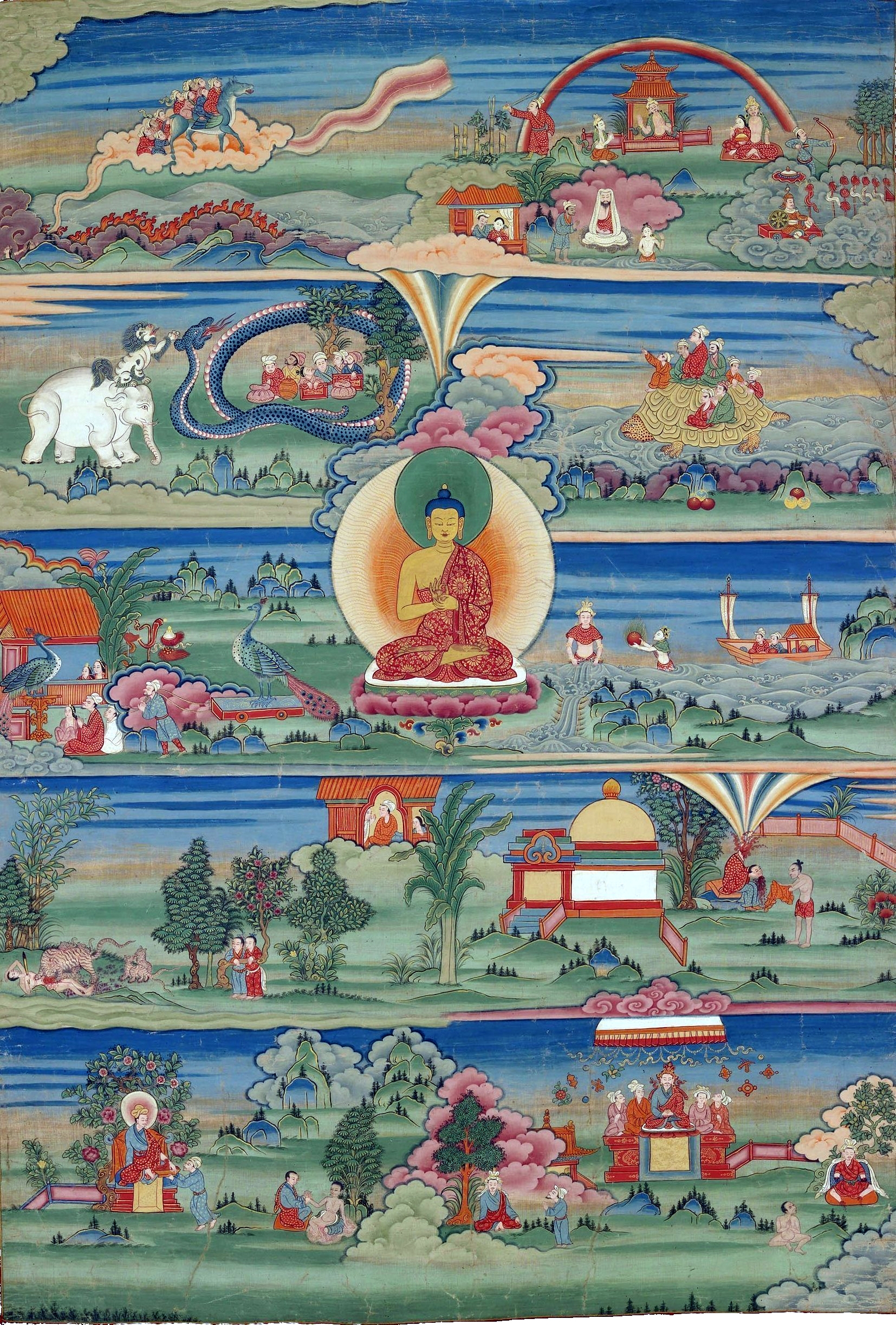
Bhutanese painted thangka of the Jātakas, 18t–19th century, Phajoding Gonpa, Thimphu, Bhutan

The Mahāsāṃghika Caitika sects from the Āndhra region also had Jātakas as part of their canon and they are known to have rejected some of the Theravāda Jātakas which dated past the time of King Ashoka. The Caitikas claimed that their own Jātakas represented the original collection before the Buddhist tradition split into various lineages.

In the Northern Buddhist tradition, Jātakas eventually came to be composed in classical Sanskrit. Perhaps the most influential and important Sanskrit Jātaka text is the Jātakamālā (Garland of Jātakas) of Āryaśūra which includes 34 Jātaka stories. This work differs from earlier sources in that it is a highly sophisticated poem which makes use of various Sanskrit literary devices. The Jātakamālā was quite influential and was imitated by later authors who wrote their own jātakamālās, mainly Haribhaṭṭa and Gopadatta. These works are all written in a classical Sanskrit genre known as campū, which is a blend of prose and verse in various meters. The jātakamālās all also use the six perfections (pāramitā) as their main framework. The influence of the jātakamālās can be seen in the Ajanta Cave complex, where illustrations of Jātakas are inscribed with quotes from Āryaśūra, with script datable to the sixth century. The Jātakamālā was also translated into Chinese in 434 CE. Borobudur, a massive 9th-century Buddhist site in Java, contains depictions of all 34 Jatakas from the Jātakamālā.

Two other Sanskrit authors associated with the jātaka genre are Kumāralāta (2nd century CE), author of the Kalpanāmaṇḍitikā Dṛṣṭāntapaṅkti (Collection of Examples, Adorned with an Artistic Arrangement) and Saṅghasena's (date unknown) Pusa benyuan jing (菩薩本縁經; Sūtra of the Bodhisattva's Avadānas). Both works exist only in Chinese translation (but there are Sanskrit fragments). These texts are a kind of predecessor to the Jātakamālā and are less poetically sophisticated.

Later Sanskrit authors continued to write in the genre. One such late text is Kṣemendra's (c. 1036–1065) Bodhisattvāvadānakalpalatā (Wish-Fulfilling Creeper Consisting in Avadānas of the Bodhisattva), a unique jātaka text written completely in verse. This work was influential on the Tibetan tradition.

Jātaka are also important in Tibetan Buddhism. They were one of the main sources of teaching and study for the popular Kadam school and later Tibetan authors produced abridged collections such as Karmapa Rangjung Dorje's Hundred Births and Padma Chopel's summary of the Avadānakalpalatā.

== Classic Jātaka sources ==
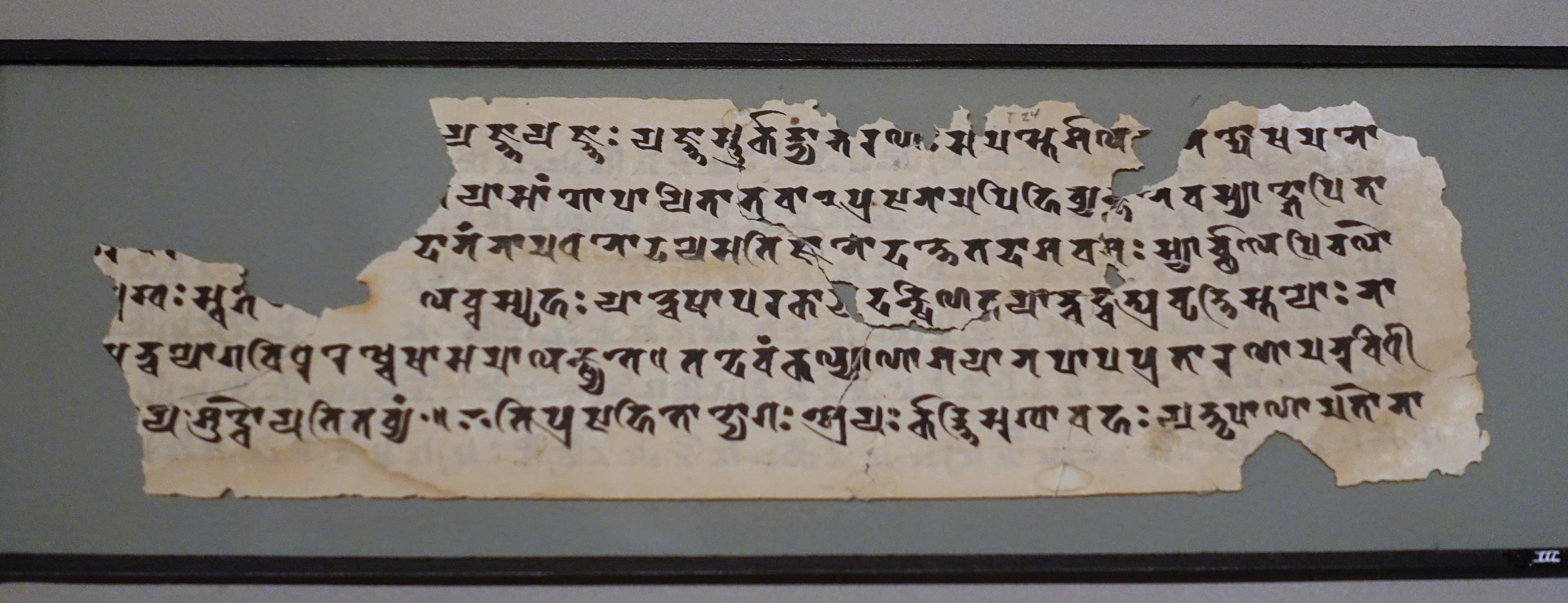
Jatakamala manuscript 8th–9th century

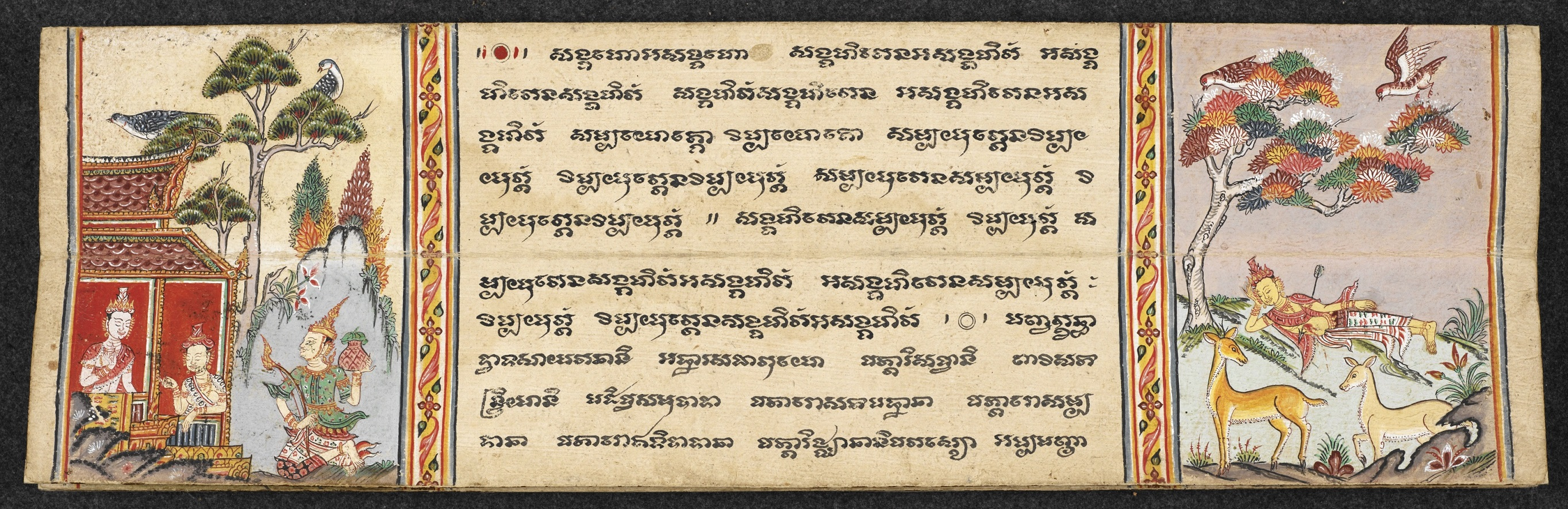
Pali manuscript of the Suvannasama Jataka, Khom Thai script (Khmer Mul script), Central Thailand, 18th century

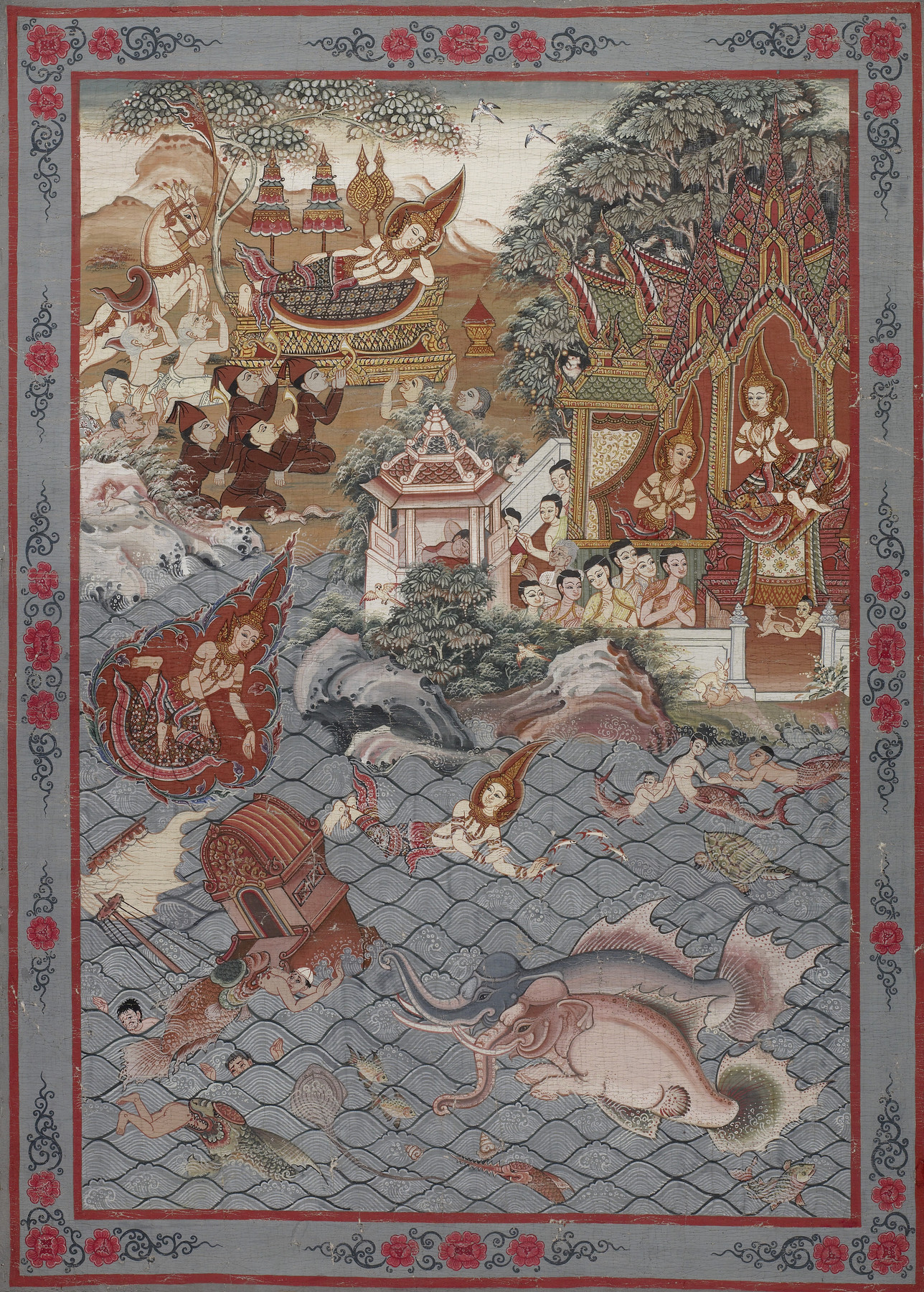
Thai painting of the Mahajanaka Jataka

There are numerous sources for classic or canonical Jātaka tales, including:

- The various Vinayapiṭakas and Sūtrapiṭakas of the different canons of the early Buddhist schools
- The Gandharan Buddhist texts contain many Jātaka narratives, though here they are more commonly termed pūrvayogas ("former connection")
- The Jātakatthavaṇṇanā, the Theravada Jātaka collection (part of the Khuddaka Nikāya) contains 547 Jātakas in mixed verse (gāthās) and prose and was collected around 500 CE. It is preceded by the Nidānakathā, which is a biography of the Buddha which relates the stories to his life. It is the largest collection of Jātakas.
- The Cariyāpiṭaka, a treatise on the bodhisattva paramis, which includes 35 Jātakas.
- Kumāralāta's (2nd century CE) Kalpanāmaṇḍitikā Dṛṣṭāntapaṅkti (Collection of Examples, Adorned with an Artistic Arrangement)
- Saṅghasena's (date unknown) Pusa benyuan jing (菩薩本縁經; Sūtra of the Bodhisattva's Avadānas)
- An untitled collection of Sanskrit avadānas and jātakas found in the Merv oasis dated to the 5th century CE
- All the Pali commentaries (Aṭṭhakathā) on the Vinayapiṭaka and Suttapiṭaka contain Jātakas, the commentary on the Dhammapada is a popular and well known source.
- The Buddhavaṃsa (Chronicle of the Buddhas) a hagiographical text of the Sinhalese Theravada school
- The Mahāvastu (Great Event), a text of the Mahāsāṅghika Lokottaravāda school, contains many jātakas and avadānas
- The Vinayavastu of the Mūlasarvāstivāda school (which only survives in complete form in Tibetan translation), contains many jātakas and avadānas
- The Avadānaśataka (The Hundred Avadānas, c. 2nd–6th century CE) contains various "Jātakāvadānas".
- The Karmaśataka
- The Divyāvadāna (Heavenly Avadānas)
- The commentary on the Udānavarga by Prajñāvarman (8th century), which survives in Tibetan, contains numerous Jātakas
- Lalitavistara (The Play in Full), a biography of the Buddha containing various Jātakas.
- The Liu du ji jing (六度集經, Scripture of the Collection of the Six Perfections, Taisho 152), translated by Kang Senghui (?–280) in the third century CE.
- Jātaka Sūtra (Sheng jing, 生經, Taisho Tripitaka 154), a Chinese collection of 55 Jātakas translated into Chinese by Dharmaraksa (3rd century).
- The Xian yu jing (賢愚經, Taisho 202), with 69 stories.
- The Da zhuang yan lun jing (大莊嚴論經, *Kalpanāmaṇḍitikā, Taisho 201), translation by Kumārajīva, with 90 stories.
- The Jātakamālā (Garland of Jātakas), a series of classical Sanskrit kāvya poems by Āryaśūra (4th century), contains 34 Jātakas.
- Haribhaṭṭa's Jātakamālā (Sanskrit)
- Sarvarakṣita's Maṇicūḍajātaka (12th-century), a Sāṃmitīya school text in 376 kāvya style stanzas.
- The Sutra of the Wise and the Foolish (Skt. Damamūka-nidāna-sūtra; Tibetan: mdo mdzangs blun; Chinese: hsien-yü ching)
- Many Mahayana sutras contain Jātakas embedded into them. For example, the Bodhisattvapiṭaka-sutra contains numerous Jātakas which are used to illustrate the various bodhisattva qualities. Likewise, Jātakas are an important element in the Large Prajñāpāramitā sutra, the Suvarṇaprabhāsa sūtra and the Bhadrakalpikasūtra. The Bhadrakalpikasūtra has a long section on the six perfections which includes around one hundred past life stories, including jātakas, pūrvayogas, and avadānas.
- The Dà zhìdù lùn (大智度論) a massive Mahāyāna Buddhist treatise and commentary which survives in Chinese translation by Kumarajiva, contains numerous Jātakas which are used to illustrate the six perfections as well as other topics.
- Kṣemendra's (c. 1036–1065) Bodhisattvāvadānakalpalatā (Wish-Fulfilling Creeper Consisting in Avadānas of the Bodhisattva)

=== Late Jātakas ===
Within the Pali tradition, there are also many non-canonical Jātakas of later composition (some dated even to the 19th century) but these are treated as a separate category of literature from the "official" Jātaka stories that have been more or less formally canonized from at least the 5th century — as attested to in ample epigraphic and archaeological evidence, such as extant illustrations in bas relief from ancient temple walls. Apocryphal Jātakas of the Pali Buddhist canon, such as those belonging to the Paññāsa Jātaka collection, have been adapted to fit local culture in certain South East Asian countries and have been retold with amendments to the plots to better reflect Buddhist morals. According to Kate Crosby, "there is also a collection of Jātaka of ten future Buddhas, beginning with Metteyya, which though less well-known today clearly circulated widely in the Theravada world."

There are also late compositions based on classic Jātakas, such as the Kavsiḷumiṇa, a poem based on the Kusa Jātaka in archaic Sinhala written King Parākkamabāhu II (13th century) and the Mahachat kham luang, the 'royal version' of the Vessantara jātaka, which was composed at the court of King Paramatrailokanātha (c. 1482). The art of putting classic Jātakas into Thai verse remains a living tradition to this day.

== Important Jātakas ==
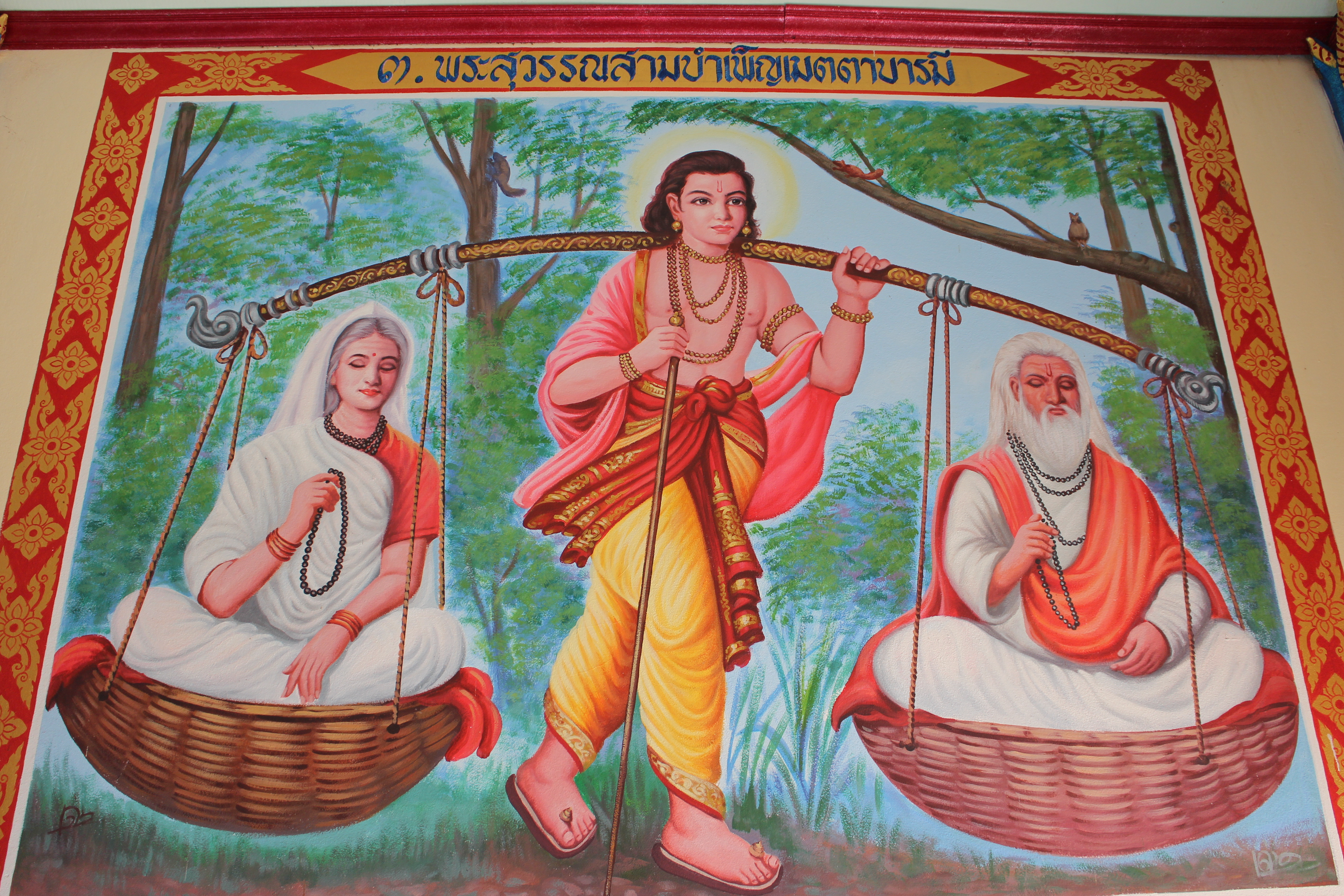
Sama cares for his blind parents, an illustration of one of the Mahānipāta jātakas

=== In Theravada ===
The Theravāda Jātakas comprise 547 poems, arranged roughly by an increasing number of verses. According to Professor von Hinüber, only the last 50 were intended to be intelligible by themselves, without commentary. The commentary gives stories in prose that it claims provide the context for the verses, and it is these stories that are of interest to folklorists. Alternative versions of some of the stories can be found in another book of the Pali Canon, the Cariyapitaka, and a number of individual stories can be found scattered around other books of the Canon. Many of the stories and motifs found in the Jātaka such as the Rabbit in the Moon of the Śaśajātaka (Jataka Tales: no.316), are found in numerous other languages and media.

The following list includes some important jātakas of the Pali tradition:

- The Ass in the Lion's Skin (Sīhacamma Jātaka)
- The Banyan Deer
- The Cock and the Cat (Kukkuṭa Jātaka)
- The Crab and the Crane
- The Elephant Girly-Face
- The Monkey King (Mahakapi Jataka)
- The Foolish, Timid Rabbit (Daddabha Jātaka)
- Four Harmonious Animals
- The Great Ape
- How the Turtle Saved His Own Life
- The Jackal and the Crow (Jambu-Khādaka Jātaka)
- The Jackal and the Otters (Dabbhapuppha Jātaka)
- The King's White Elephant
- The Lion and the Woodpecker (Javasakuṇa Jātaka)
- The Measure of Rice
- The Merchant of Seri
- The Monkey and the Crocodile
- The Ox Who Envied the Pig (Muṇika-Jātaka)
- The Ox Who Won the Forfeit
- The story of Romaka pigeon (Romaka Jātaka, previous life of the Buddha as a pigeon).
- Prince Sattva
- The Princes and the Water-Sprite
- The Quarrel of the Quails
- The Swan with Golden Feathers (Suvaṇṇahaṃsa Jātaka)
- King Sibi
- King Dasharatha
- The Tiger, the Brahmin and the Jackal
- The Turtle Who Couldn't Stop Talking (Kacchapa Jātaka)
- The Twelve Sisters
- The Wise and the Foolish Merchant
- Vessantara Jataka
- Why the Owl Is Not King of the Birds

=== Āryaśūra's Jātakamālā ===
Āryaśūra's Jātakamālā, a very influential Sanskrit work that was depicted throughout the Buddhist world, contains the following Jātakas (which teach various virtues):

- The Story of the Tigress (Vyāghrī-jātaka) (the bodhisattva ideal: dāna-pāramitā) a prince at the sight of an emaciated tigress with cubs, decides to sacrifice his body to feed them
- The Story of the King of the Śibis (dāna)
- The Story of the Small Portion of Gruel (Dāna)
- The Story of the Head of A Guild (Dāna)
- The Story of Aviṣahya, the Head of a Guild (Dāna)
- The Story of the Hare (Dāna)
- The Story of Agastya (Dāna)
- The Story of Maitrībala (Dāna)
- The Story of Viśvantara (Dāna)
- The Story of the Sacrifice (teaches Śīla, morality)
- The Story of Sakra (Karuṇā, compassion)
- The Story of the Brāhman (Hrī, self-respect)
- The Story of Unmādayantī (Dhairya, "self-control")
- The Story of Supāraga (Sacca, truth)
- The Story of the Fish (Sacca, truth)
- The Story of the Quail's Young (Sacca, truth)
- The Story of the Jar (Vāra, excellence)
- The Story of the Childless One (Praviveka, seclusion)
- The Story of the Lotus-Stalks (Praviveka)
- The Story of the Treasurer (Hrī)
- The Story of Cuḍḍabodhi (Khanti, patient acceptance)
- The Story of the Holy Swans (Maitrī, loving-kindness)
- The Story of Mahābodhi (Khanti)
- The Story of the Great Ape (Anukampā, compassion)
- The Story of the Śarabha (Anukampā)
- The Story of the Ruru-Deer (Dayā, kindness)
- The Story of the Great Monkey (Anuvartinā, obedience)
- The Story of Kṣāntivādin (Khanti)
- The Story of the Inhabitant of the Brahmaloka (Anukampā)
- The Story of the Elephant (Karuṇā)
- The Story of Sutasoma (Satsaṁga, goodness)
- The Story of Ayogṛha (Saṃvega, spiritual urgency)
- The Story of the Buffalo (Khanti)
- The Story of the Woodpecker (Khanti)

== Jātakas in art and culture ==
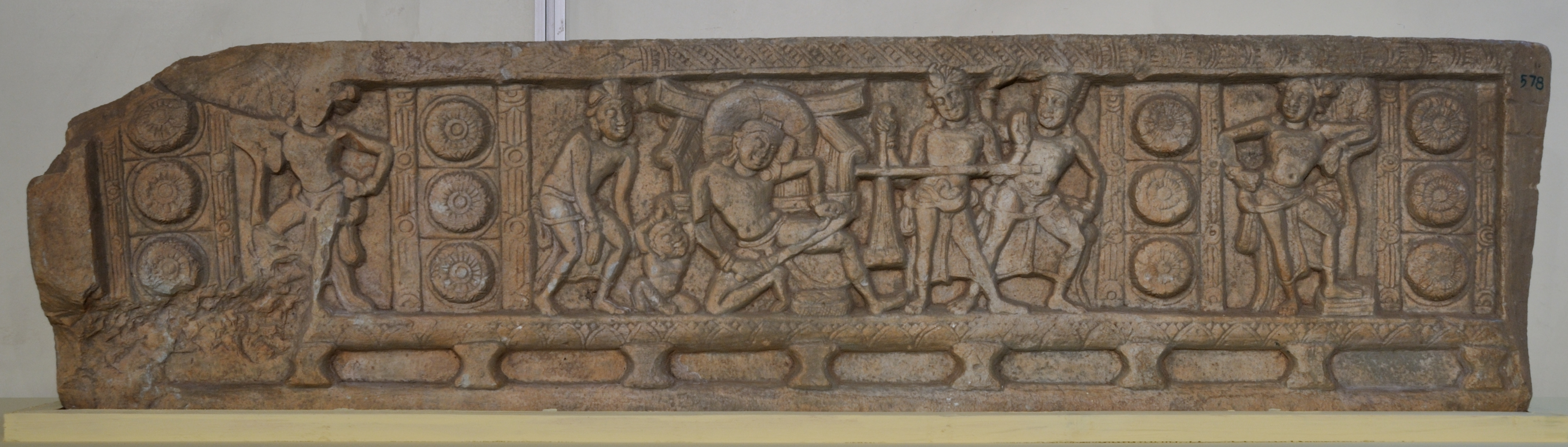
Sibi Jataka in limestone at Nagarjunakonda (c. 3rd–4th Century CE), Andhra Pradesh

Jātakas have been important as a way to spread Buddhist teachings and they were widely used as part of sermons, rituals, festivals, and various forms of art. Kate Crosby writes that they have been depicted in varied forms as "apocryphal literature, vernacular retellings, performance, temple art, temporary street and festival art, films, comics, and cartoons." The sponsorship of Jātaka recitations, copyings and art eventually grew to be seen as an act which generated merit for lay Buddhists. These acts are more common around important festivals like Vesak.

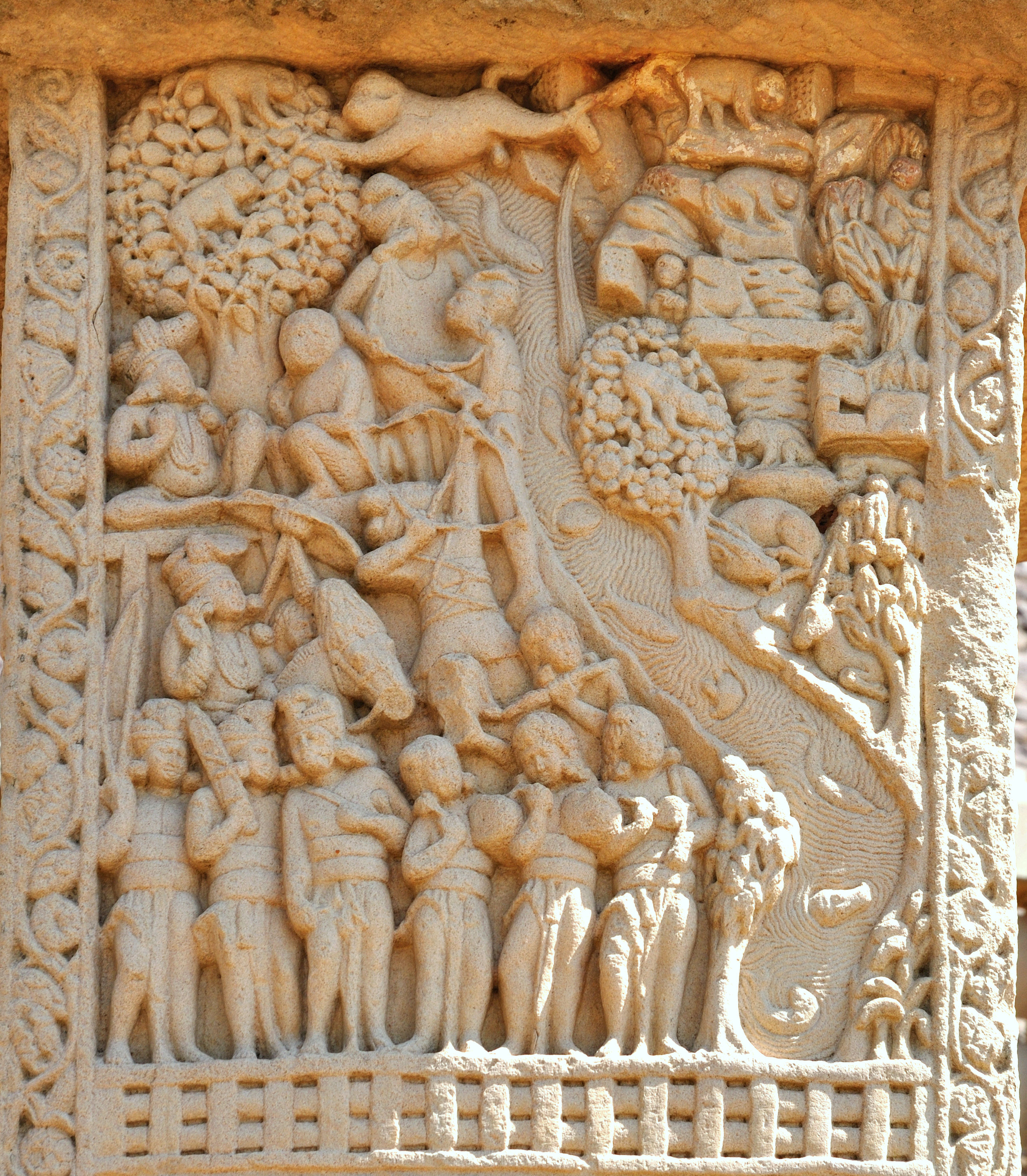
Mahakapi Jataka, Sanchi

The earliest archeological findings which depict Jātakas are the illustrations found on the Bharhut stupa railing as well as at Sanchi (c. late 2nd – 1st century BCE), which also include inscriptions. After this, Jātakas appear at many Buddhist sites, like at Ajanta. Similar Jātaka tales are found in murals of Silk Road sites of the pre-Tang period (ca. 421–640 C.E.), such as at Kucha. They are also found in early Southeast Asian sites, especially at Bagan sites. Burmese Buddhism has an extensive tradition of Jātaka illustration, one of the best examples being the illustrations found at Ananda Temple (which depicts 554 tales).

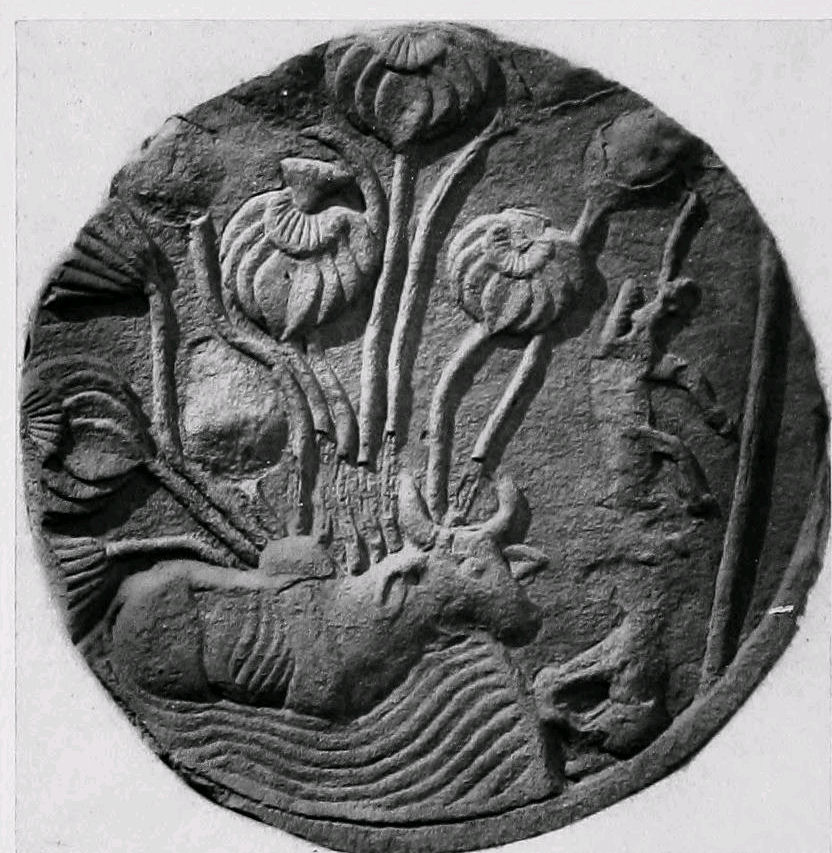
Bharhut, Bull and Tiger Jataka

Jātaka tales are often associated with specific locations. Originally, this applied to specific places in India, which served as Buddhist pilgrimage sites. Later traditions expanded this to include other places throughout the Buddhist world. According to Naomi Appleton, the fact that Jātaka tales lack specific references to specific places allowed them to be easily transported and re-localized. This flexibility contributed to the lasting popularity of the Jātakas. This tradition of associating Jātaka tales with regions outside of India played an important part in the promotion and legitimisation of Buddhism in these regions.

Thus, many stupas in Nepal and northern India are said to mark locations from the Jātaka tales. Chinese pilgrims like Xuanzang and Faxian reported several of these and discussed the stories connected with them. Sites discussed by these figures include the "four great stupas" as well as stupas in Pushkalavati, Mangalura, Hadda Mountain, and Sarvadattaan.

According to Naomi Appleton, the "four great stupas" visited by Faxian (337–422 CE) are:

the first (in 'So-ho-to') was where the Buddha ransomed the life of a dove with his own flesh; the second (in Gandhāra) was where he gave away his eyes to a blind beggar; and the third and fourth (in Takshaśilā) were where he gave away his head to a man and his whole body to a starving tigress who was about to eat her own cubs, and where 'kings, ministers, and peoples of all the kingdoms around vie with one another in making offerings'. A century later, Songyun writes of the same four sites and also mentions a whole area associated with the Vessantara-jātaka.

=== Artistic depictions at major sites ===
Numerous Indian Buddhist archeological sites contain illustrations of Jātakas, and thus they are important artistic sources for Jātakas. Some of the main sites include:

- Ajanta Caves
- Amaravati
- Bagh Caves
- Bharhut
- Goli
- Kanaganahalli
- Mathura
- Nagarjunakonda
- Sanchi

Other ancient sites outside of India which contain Jataka illustrations include Borobudor, Dunhuang (the Mogao caves), Polonnoruwa, Anuradhapura, Bagan city, and Nakhon Pathom. Jataka illustrations (especially of the last 10 stories of the canonical Pali collection) are widespread in the Theravada Buddhist world, adorning many temples, wats and key sites.

=== Performance ===
According to the Chinese pilgrim Yijing, who visited India in the 7th century, jātaka plays were performed 'throughout the five countries of India'. This culture of performance spread to other regions as well.

In Tibet, the Viśvāntara-jātaka was transformed into a popular play called the Dri med kun ldan. Other popular jataka plays include Nor bzaṅ or Sudhana and the story of Prince Maṇicūḍa (Lokānanda).

In Theravada countries, several of the longer tales such as "The Twelve Sisters" and the Vessantara Jataka are still performed in dance, theatre, puppetry, and formal (quasi-ritual) recitation. Such celebrations are associated with particular holidays on the lunar calendar used by Thailand, Myanmar, Sri Lanka and Laos. The recitation of the Vessantara Jataka remains an important ceremony in Theravada countries today.

=== Gallery ===
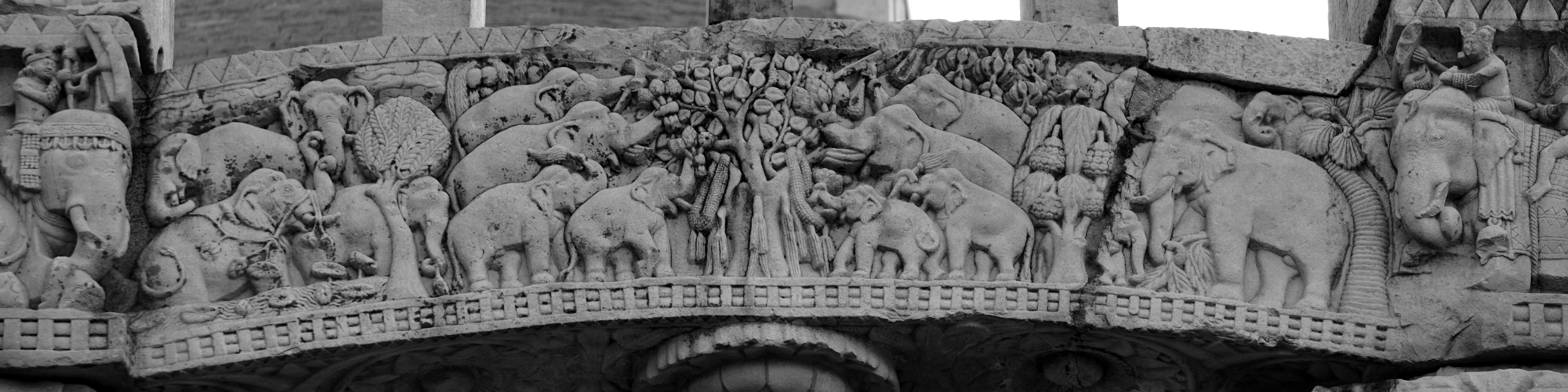
Chaddanta Jataka, Sanchi

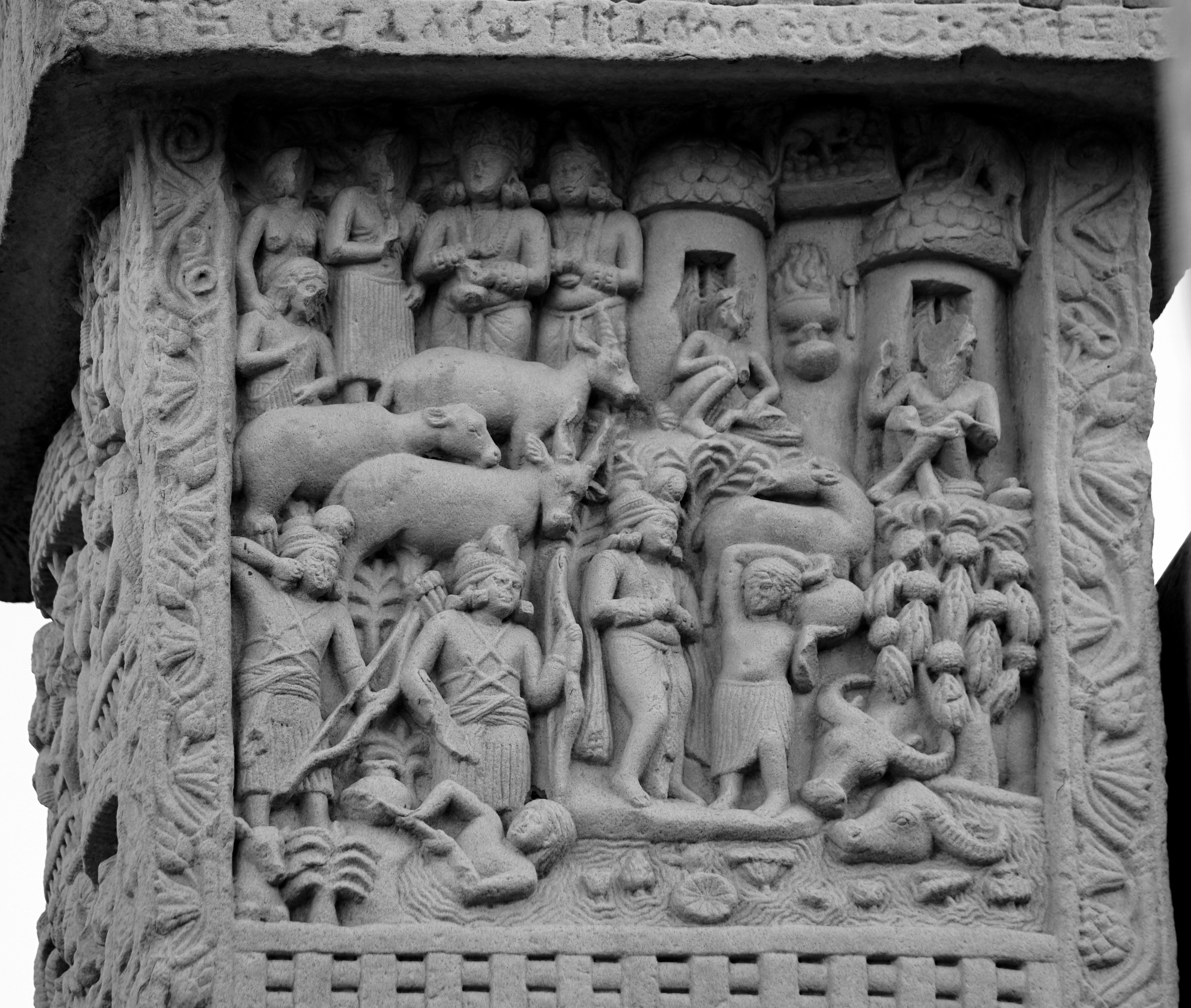
Sama Jataka, Sanchi

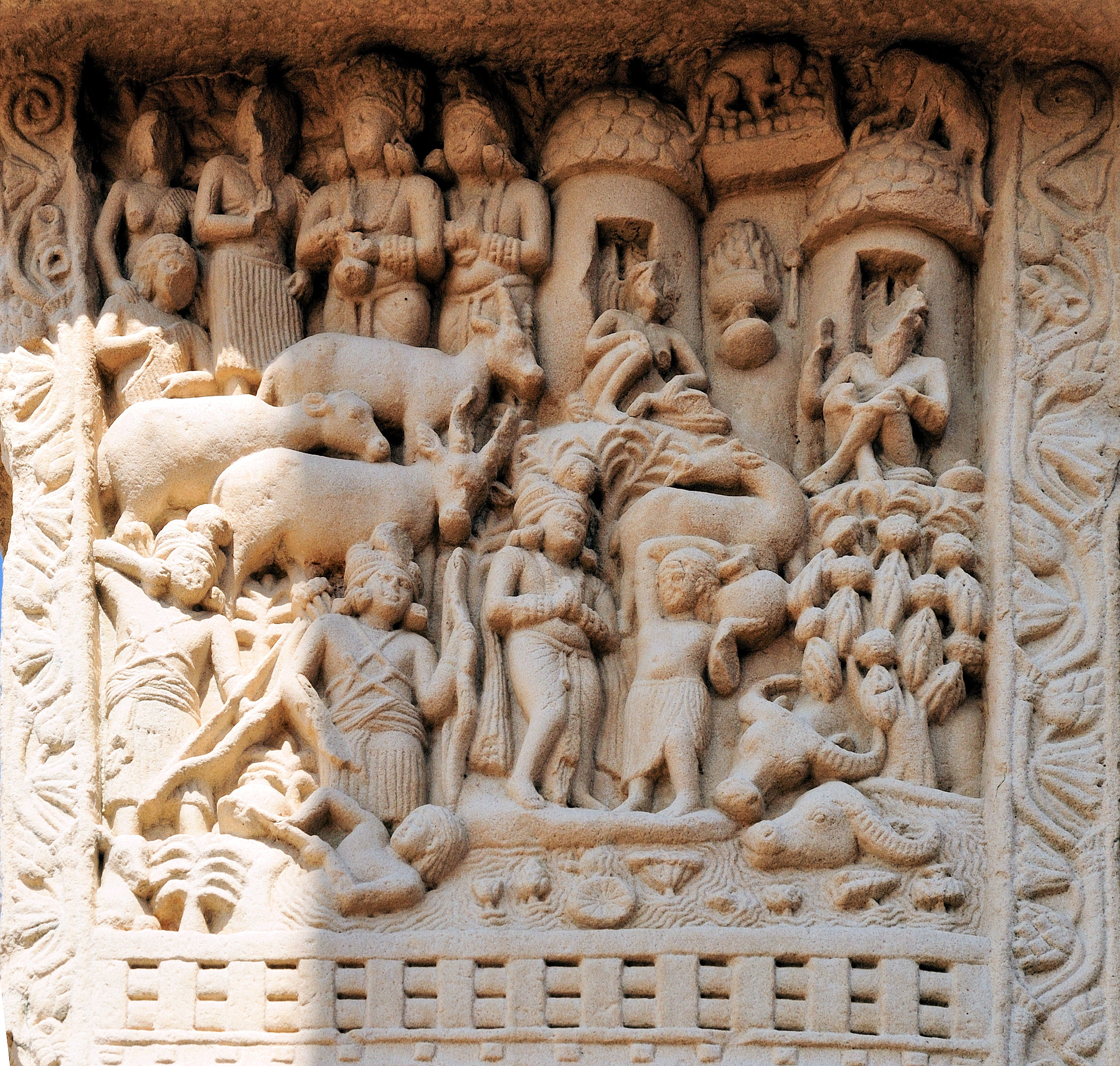
Syama Jataka Sanchi Stupa

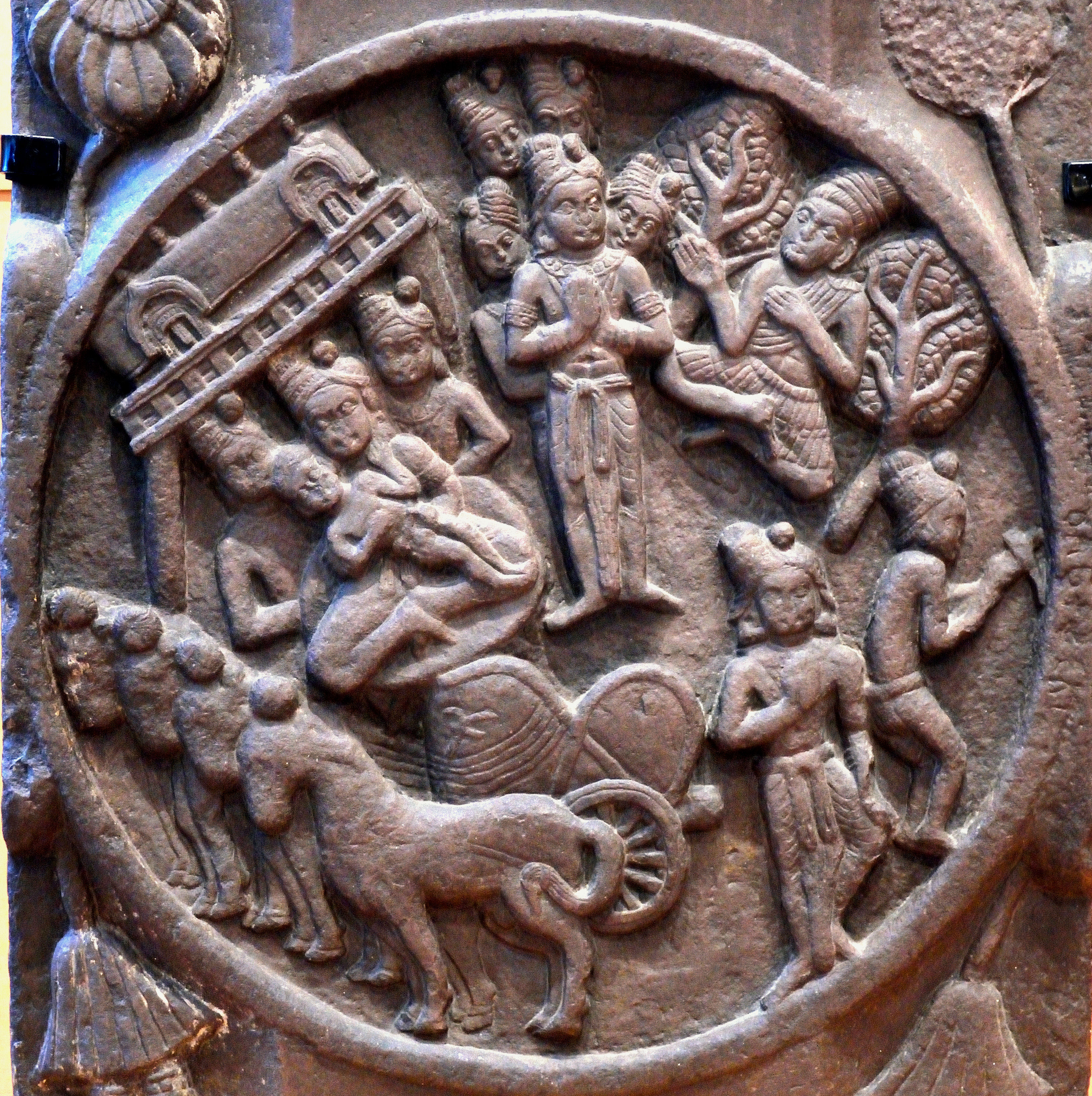
Muga Pakha Jataka, Bharhut

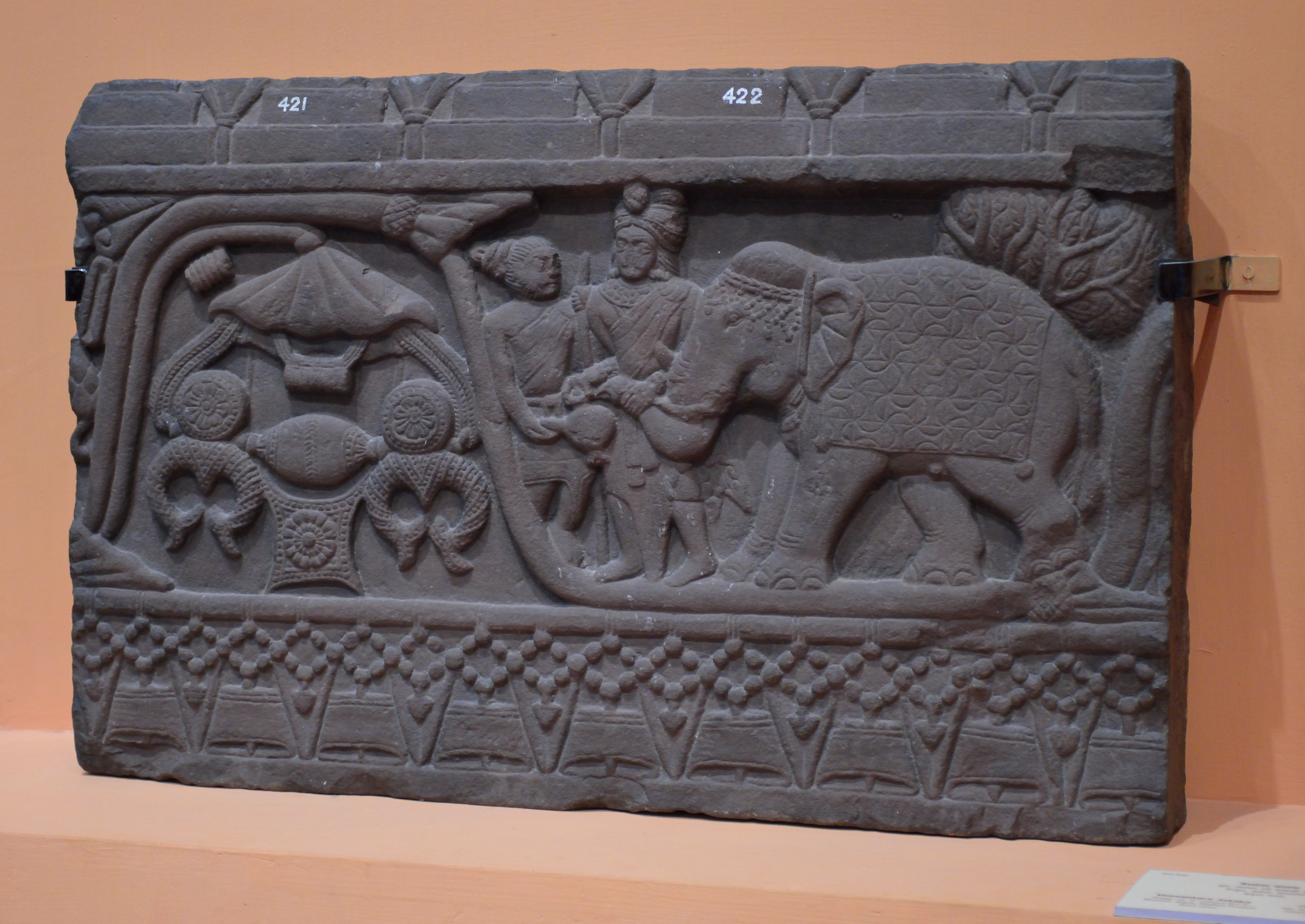
Vessantara Jataka, Bharhut, Shunga period

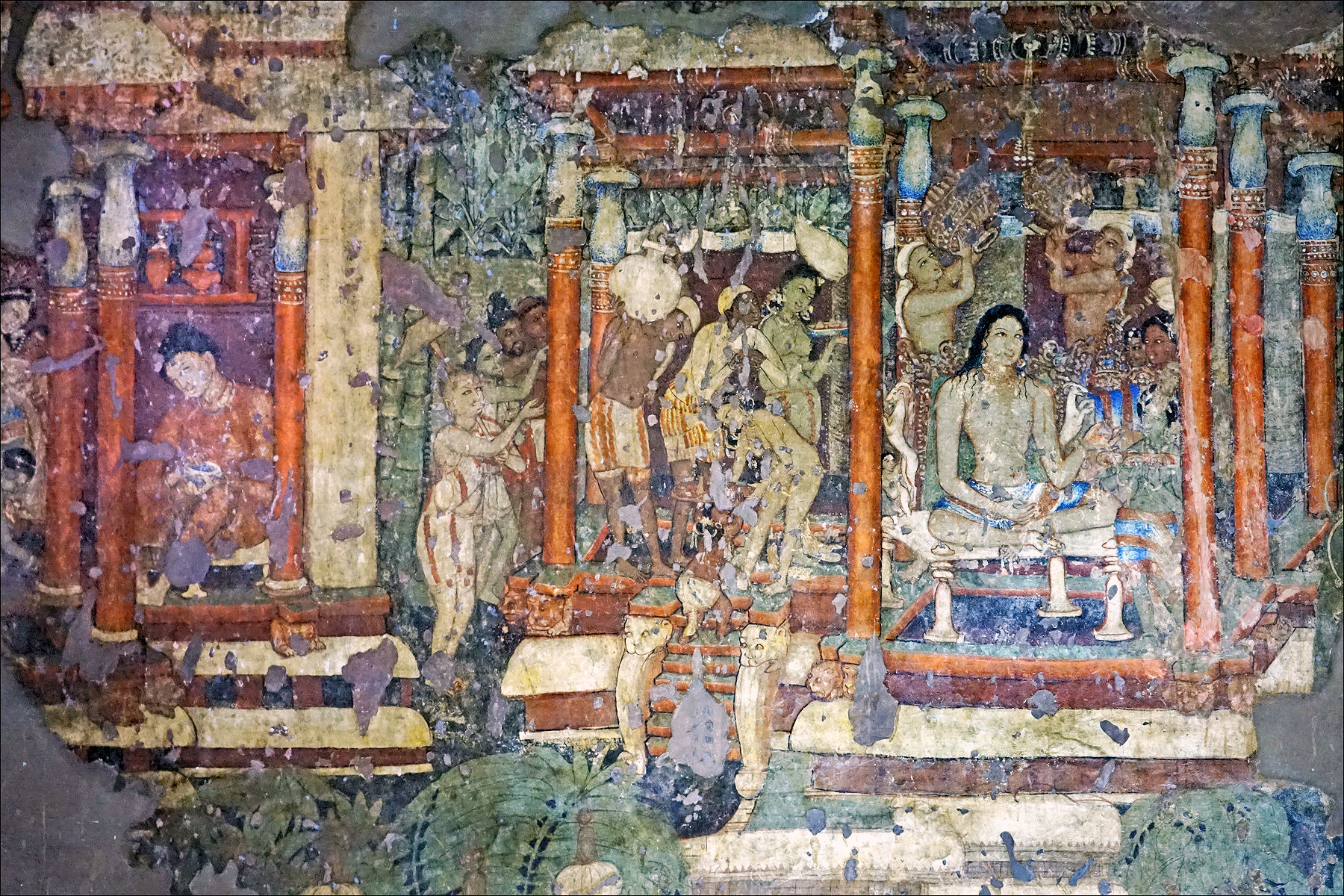
Ajanta Cave 1, Mahajanaka Jataka

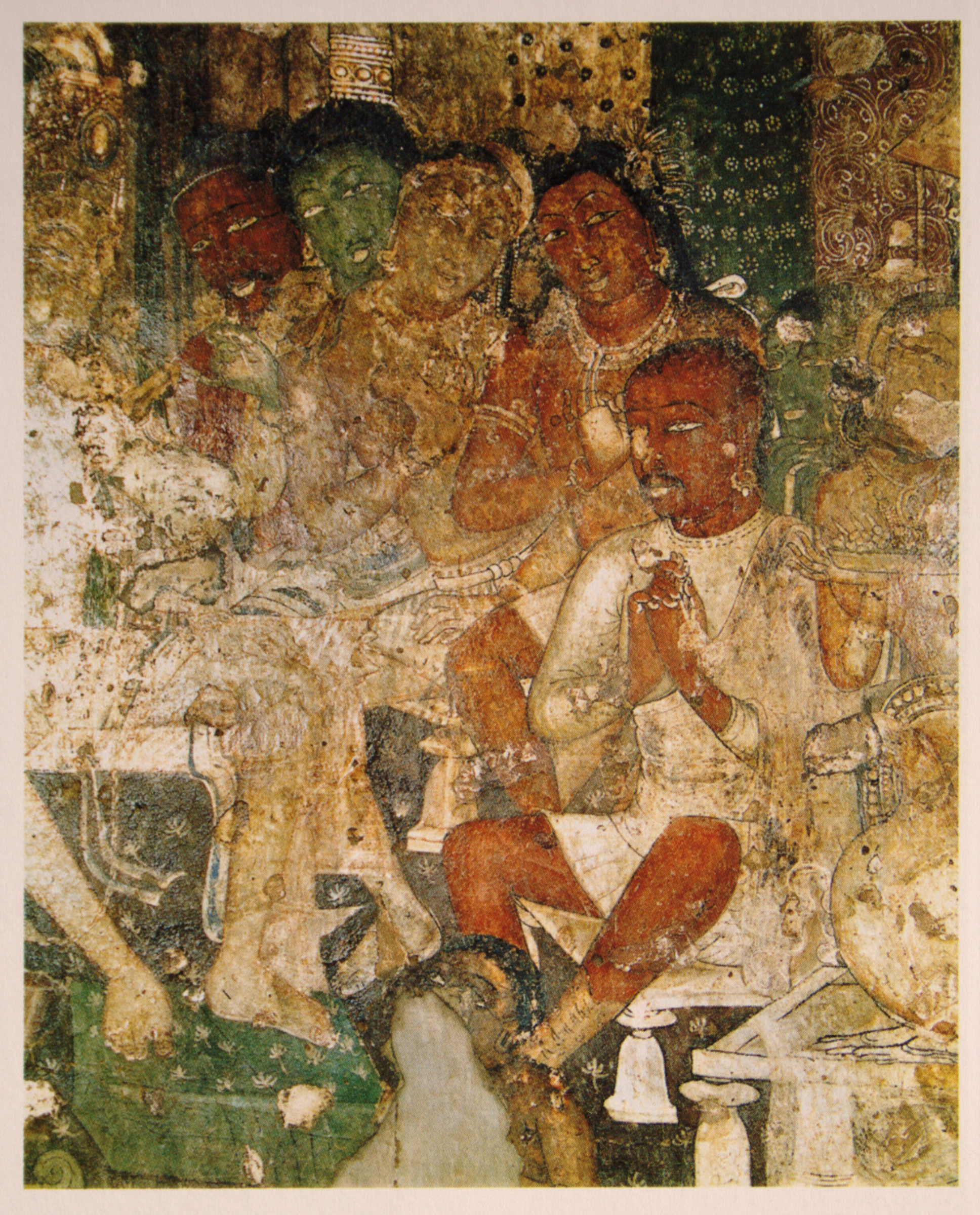
Hamsa jataka, Ajanta Caves

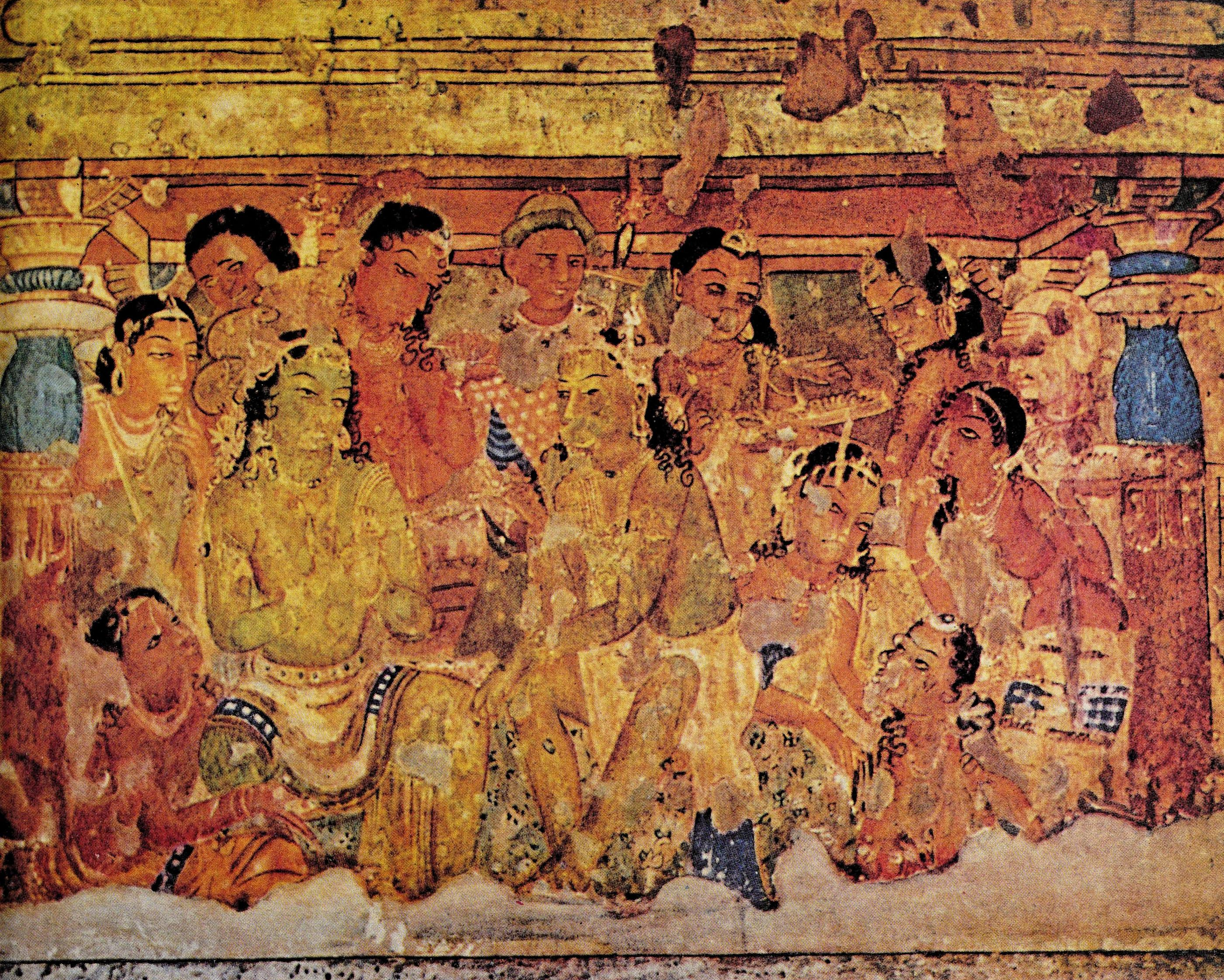
Ajanta cave 1, Chanpeyya Jataka

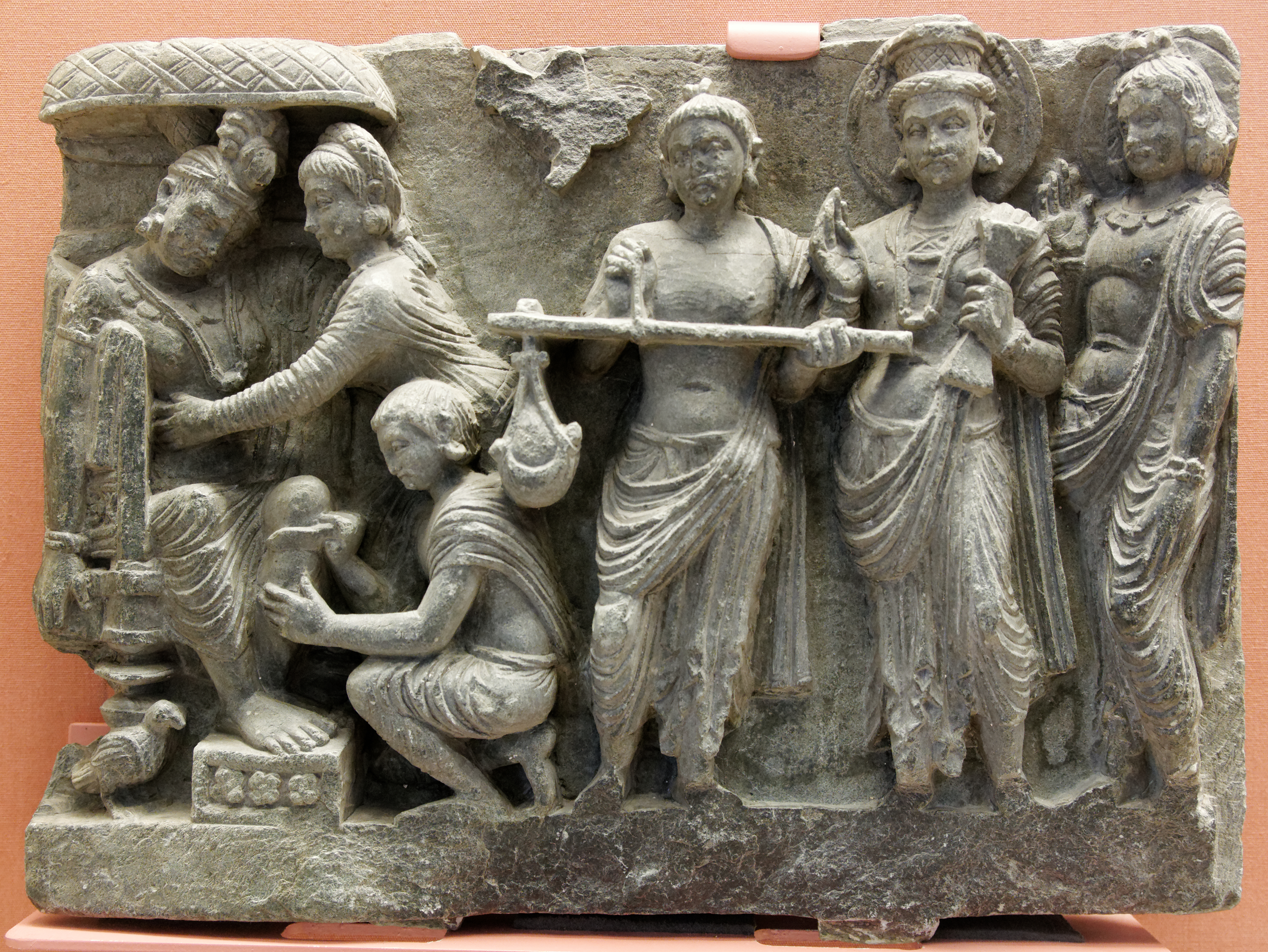
Sibi Jataka, Gandhara

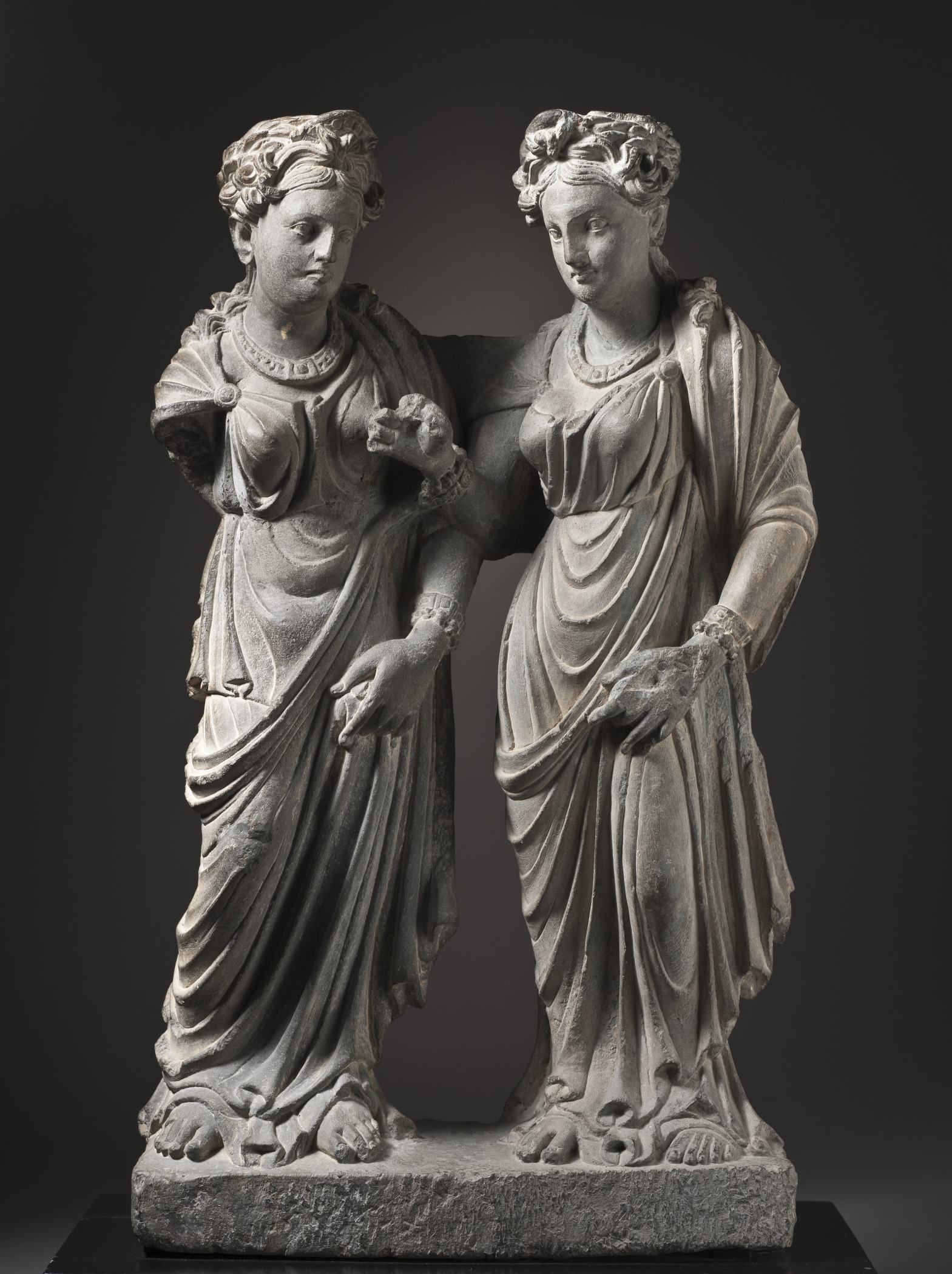
Maha-Ummagga Jataka, Gandhara, 2nd century CE

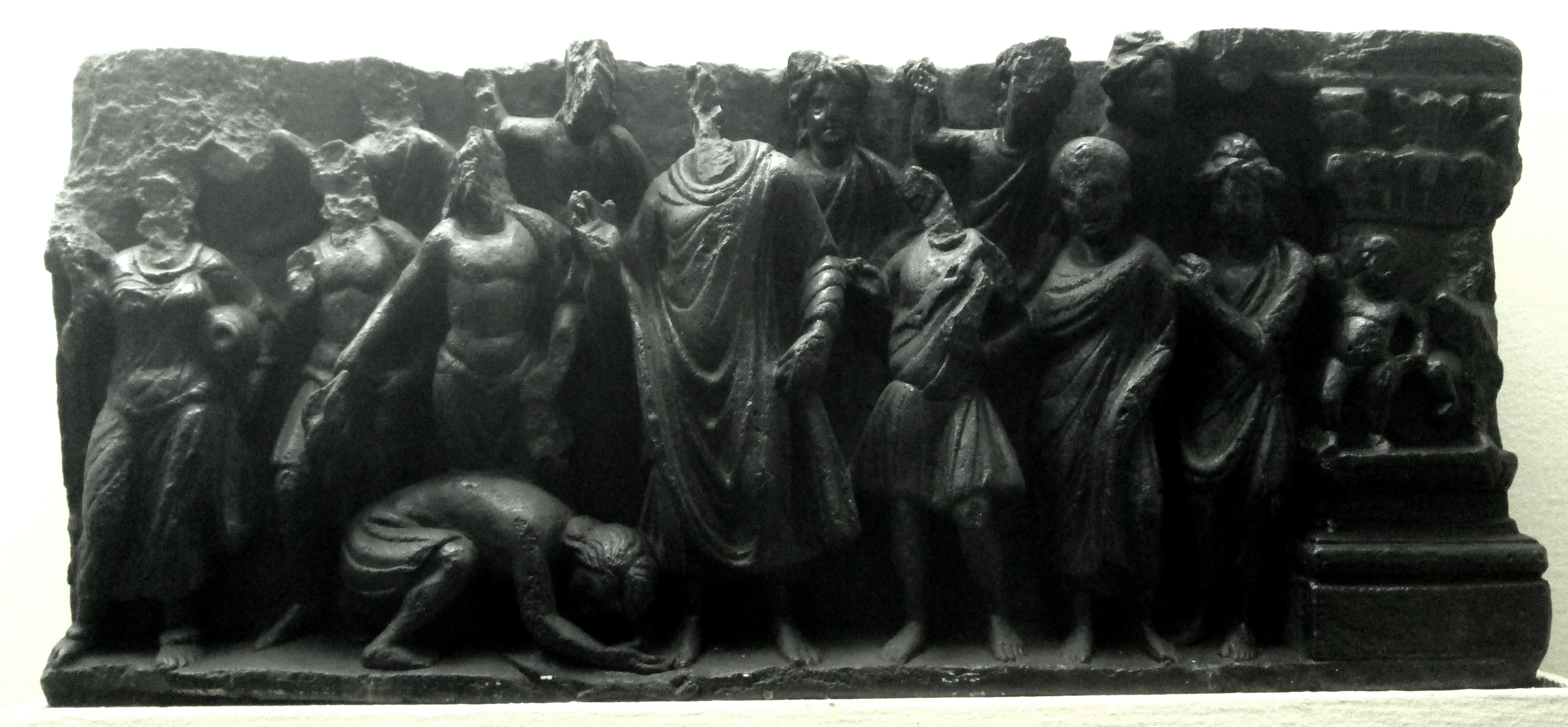
Dipankara Jataka, Jamalgarhi

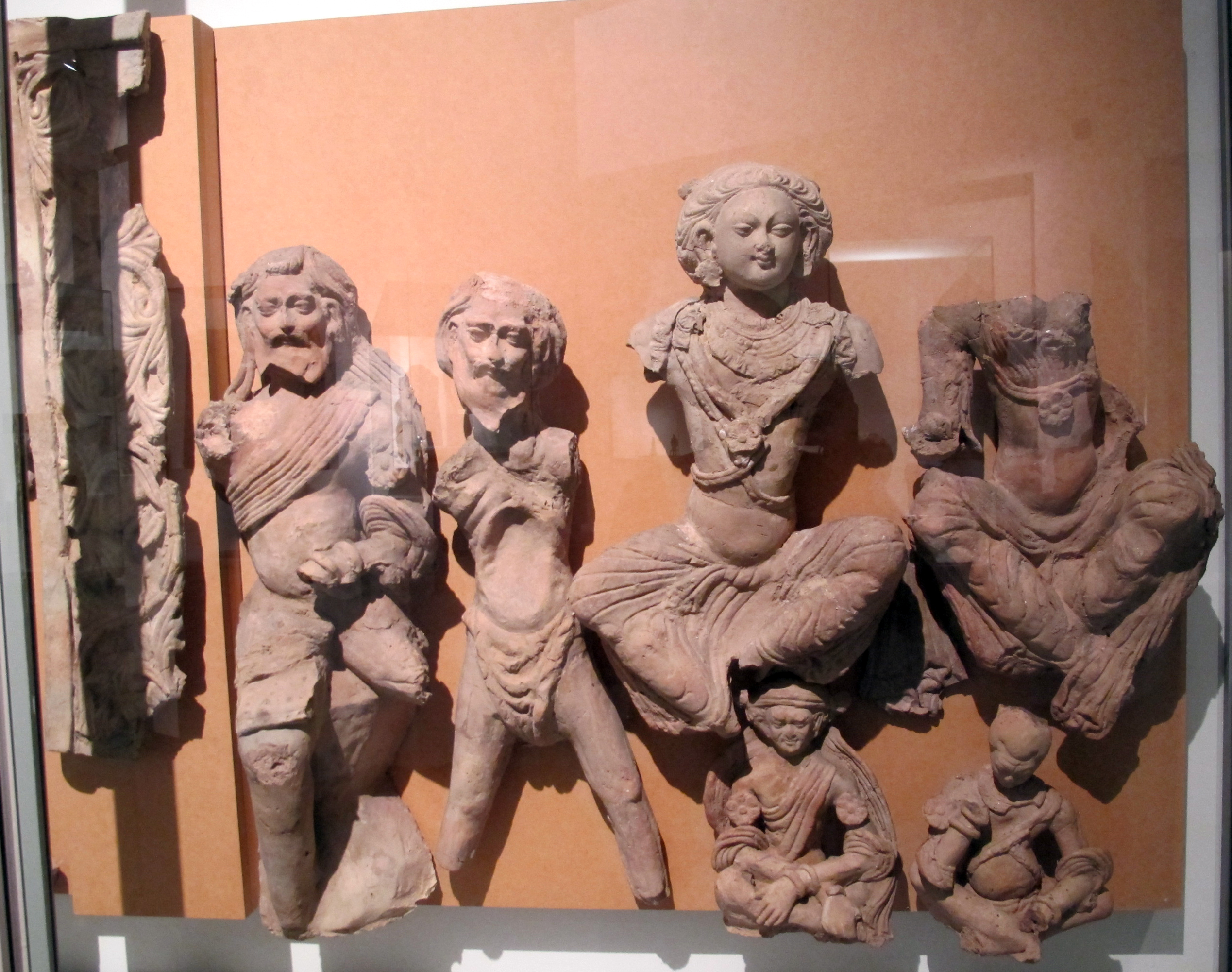
Tumshuq, Toqquz-sarai monastery, Visvamtara-jataka

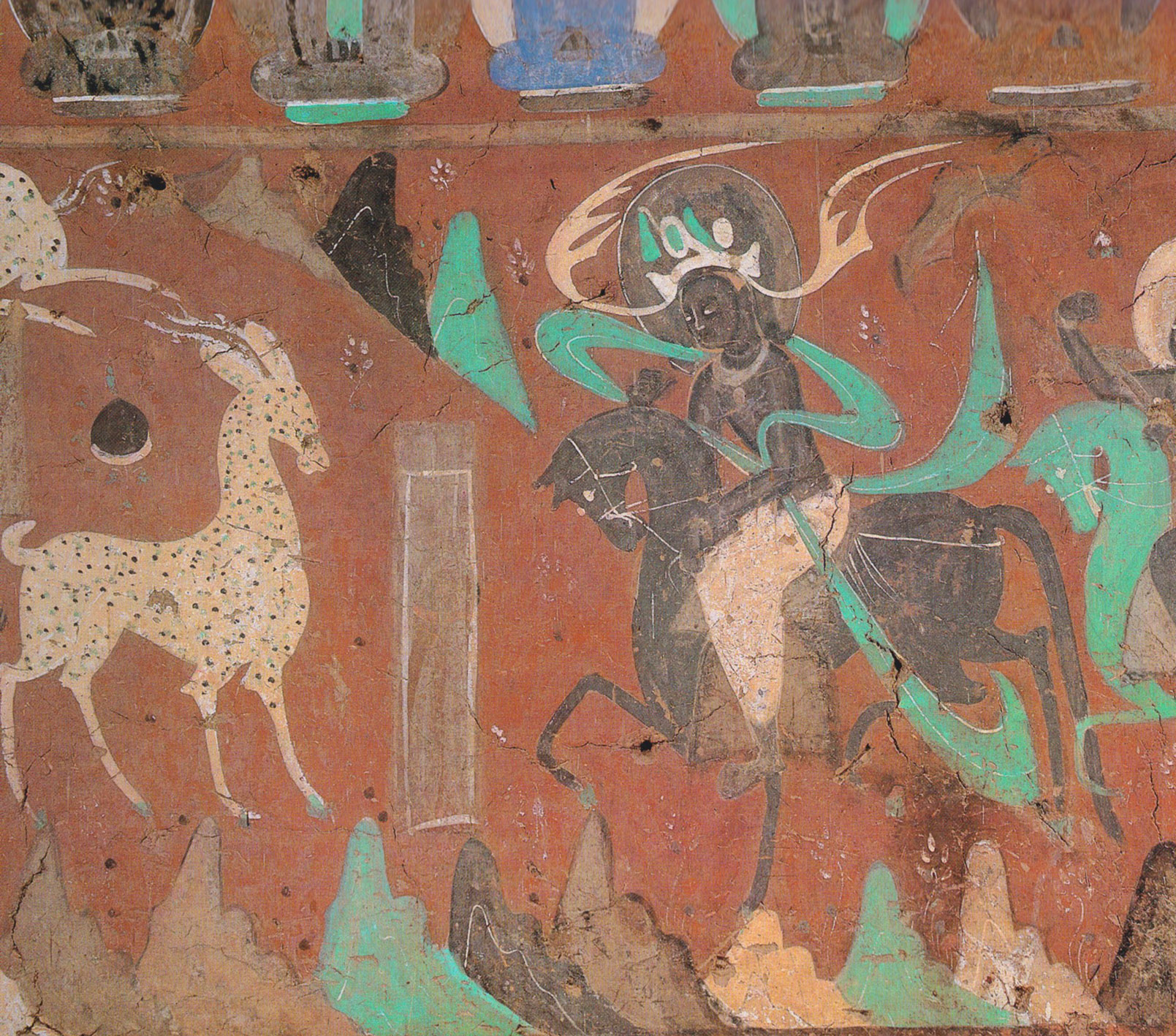
Nine-colored deer jataka. Northern Wei. Mogao cave 257

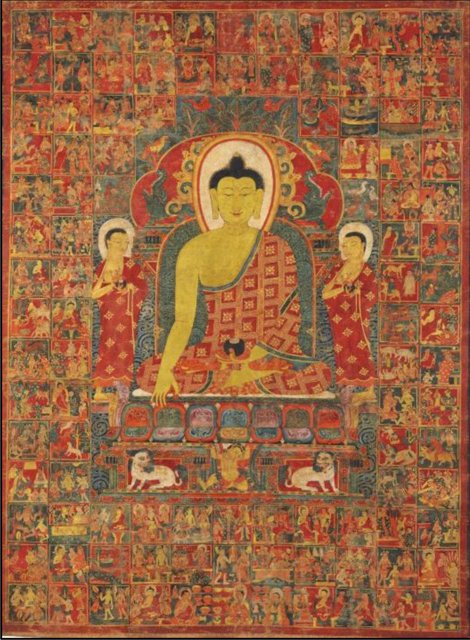
Thangka of Buddha with the One Hundred Jataka Tales in the background, Tibet, 13th-14th century.

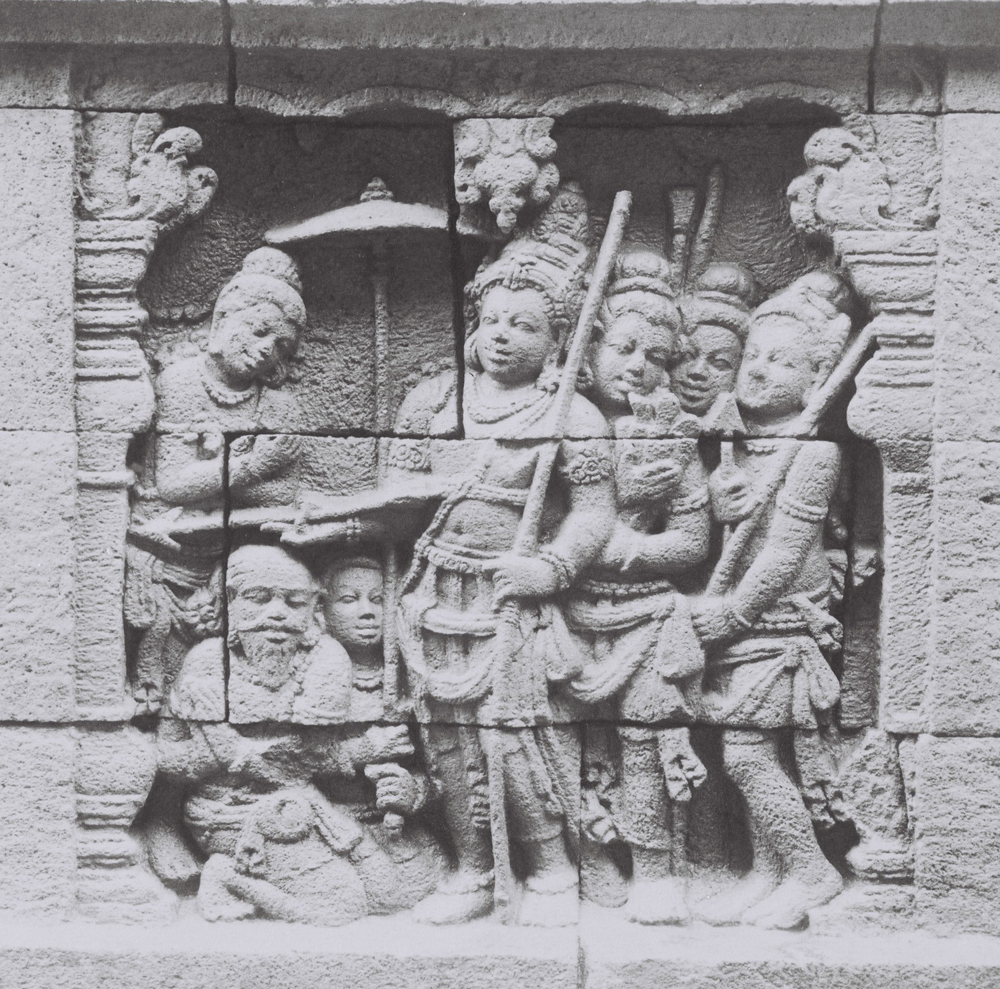
Khudda-bodhi-Jataka, Borobudur

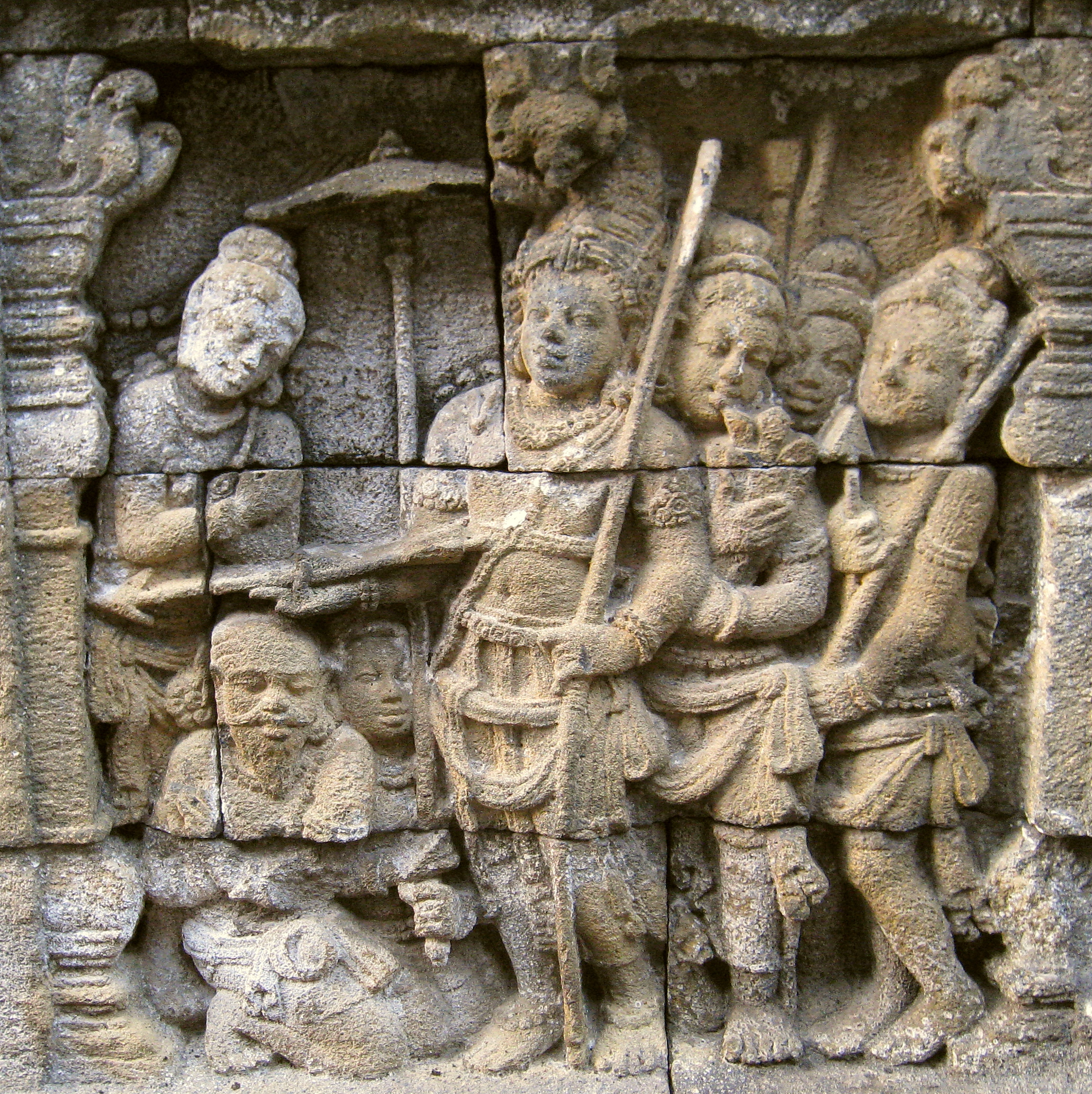
Borobudur Jataka, Level 1 Balustrade, South Wall

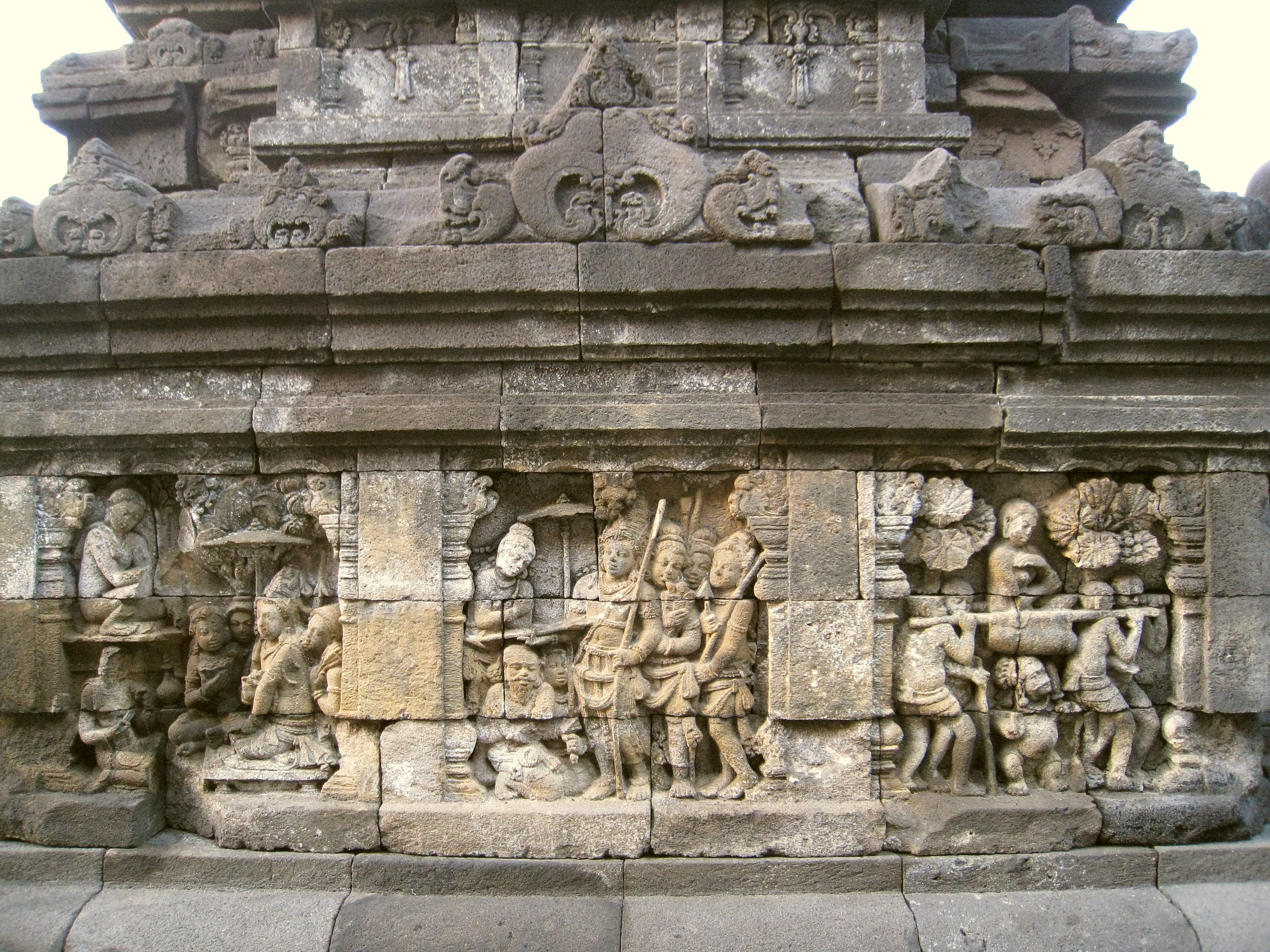
Borobudur Jataka, Level 1 Balustrade, South Wall

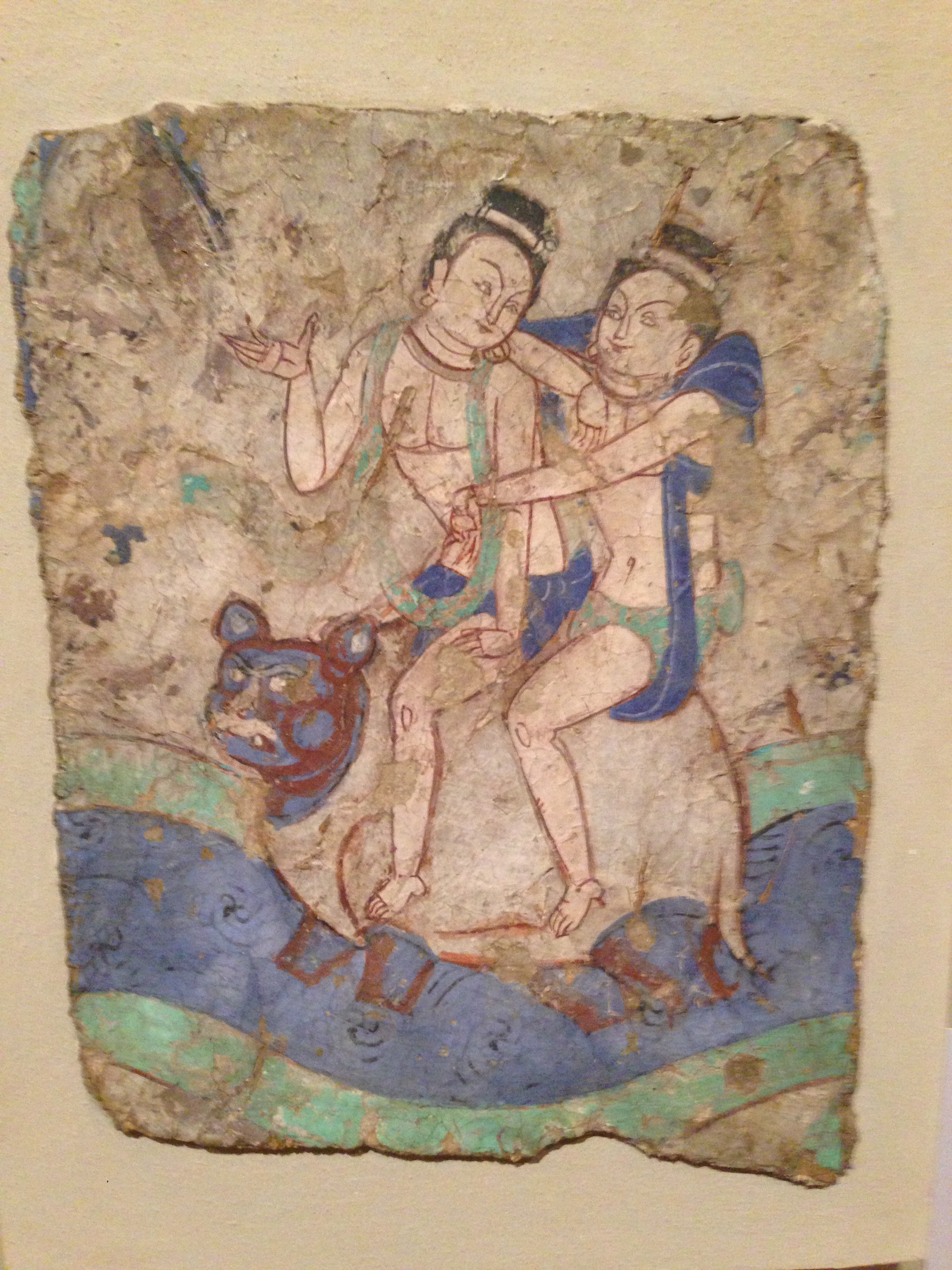
Kucha, Turtle King Jataka

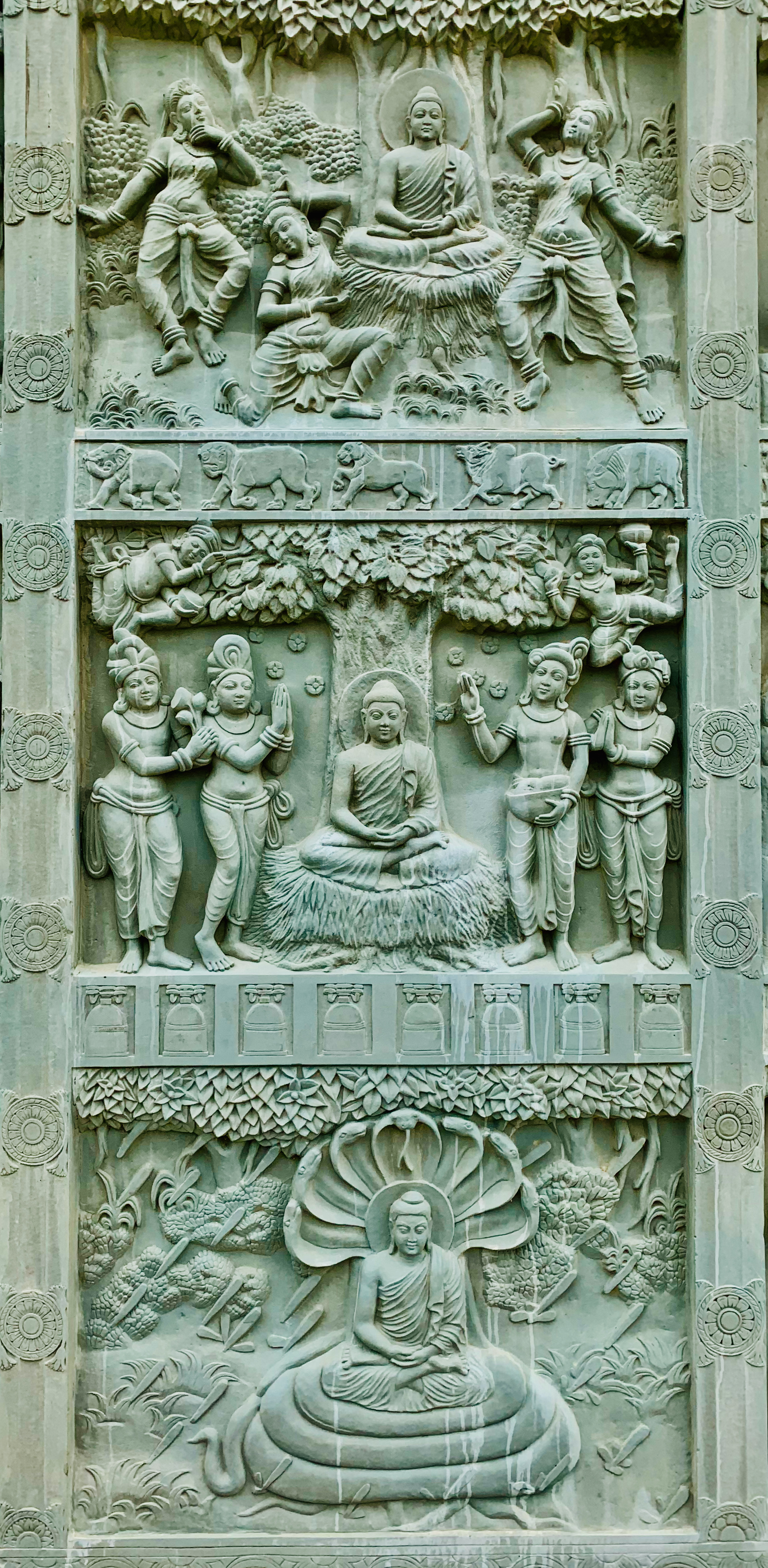
Modern era rendition of the Jataka tales by a Myanmar-based Vipassana center in India

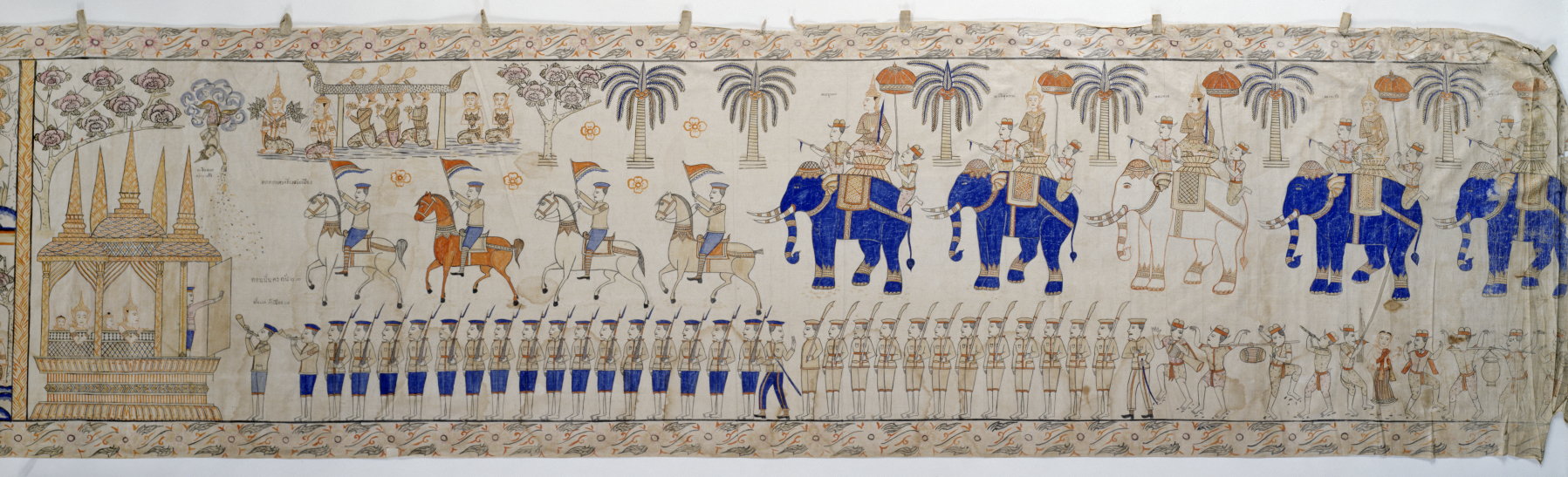
Thai Vessantara Jataka Narrative Scroll

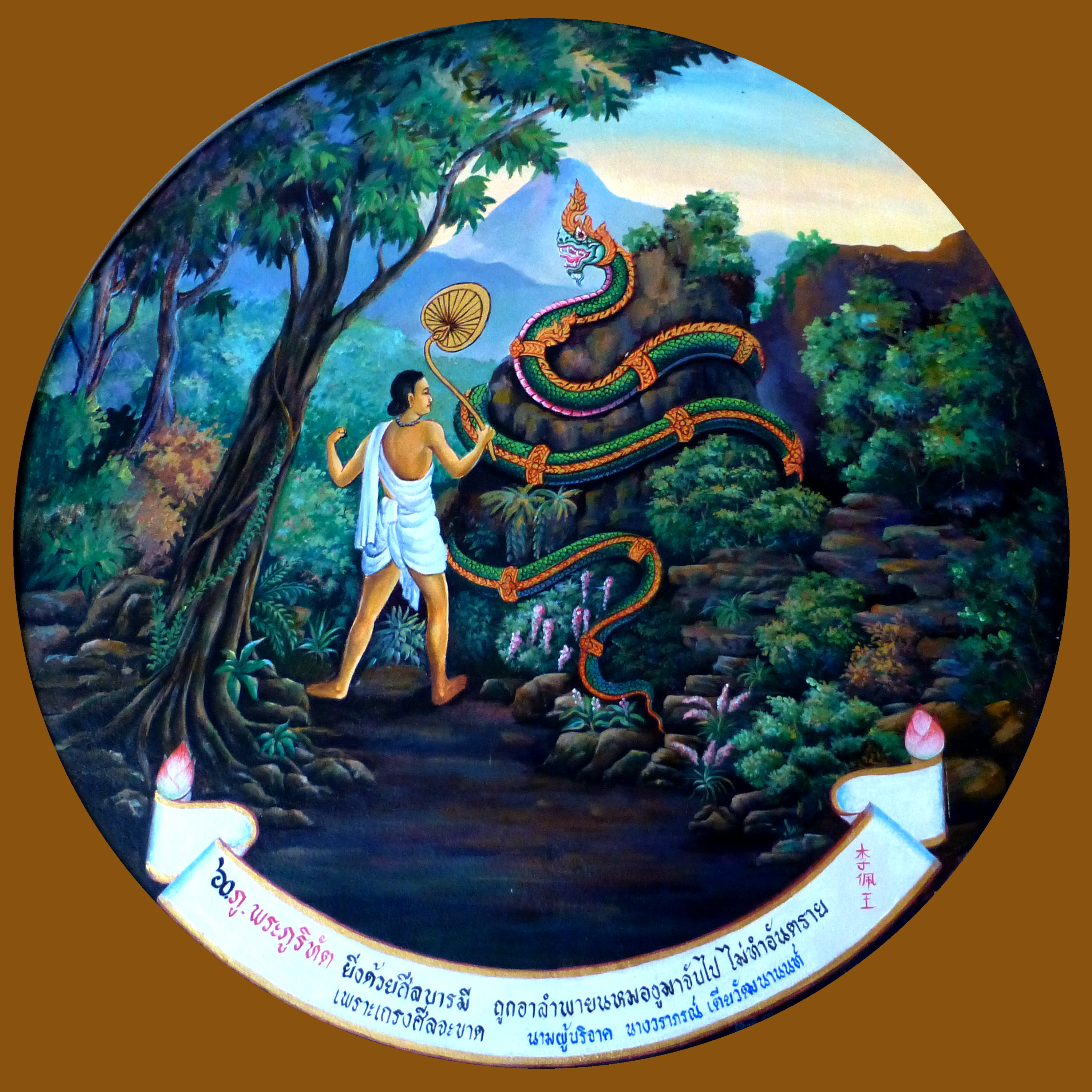
King Bhuridatta although caught by Alambayana maintains his Virtue, Bhuridatta Jataka

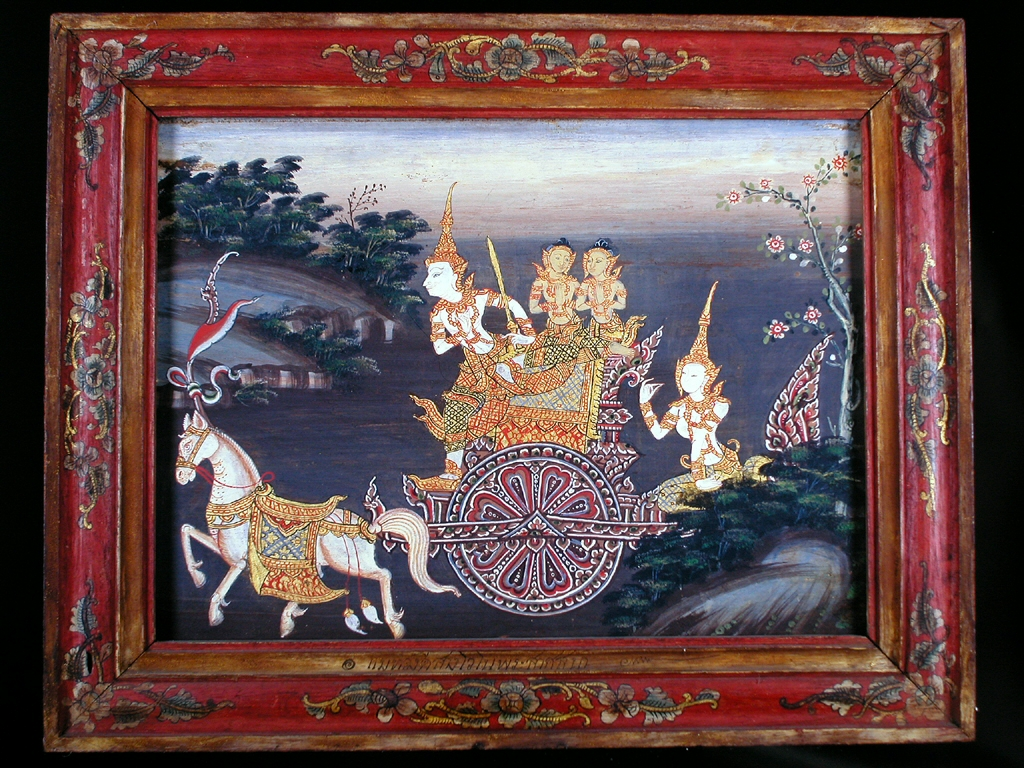
Thai Vessantara Jataka painting

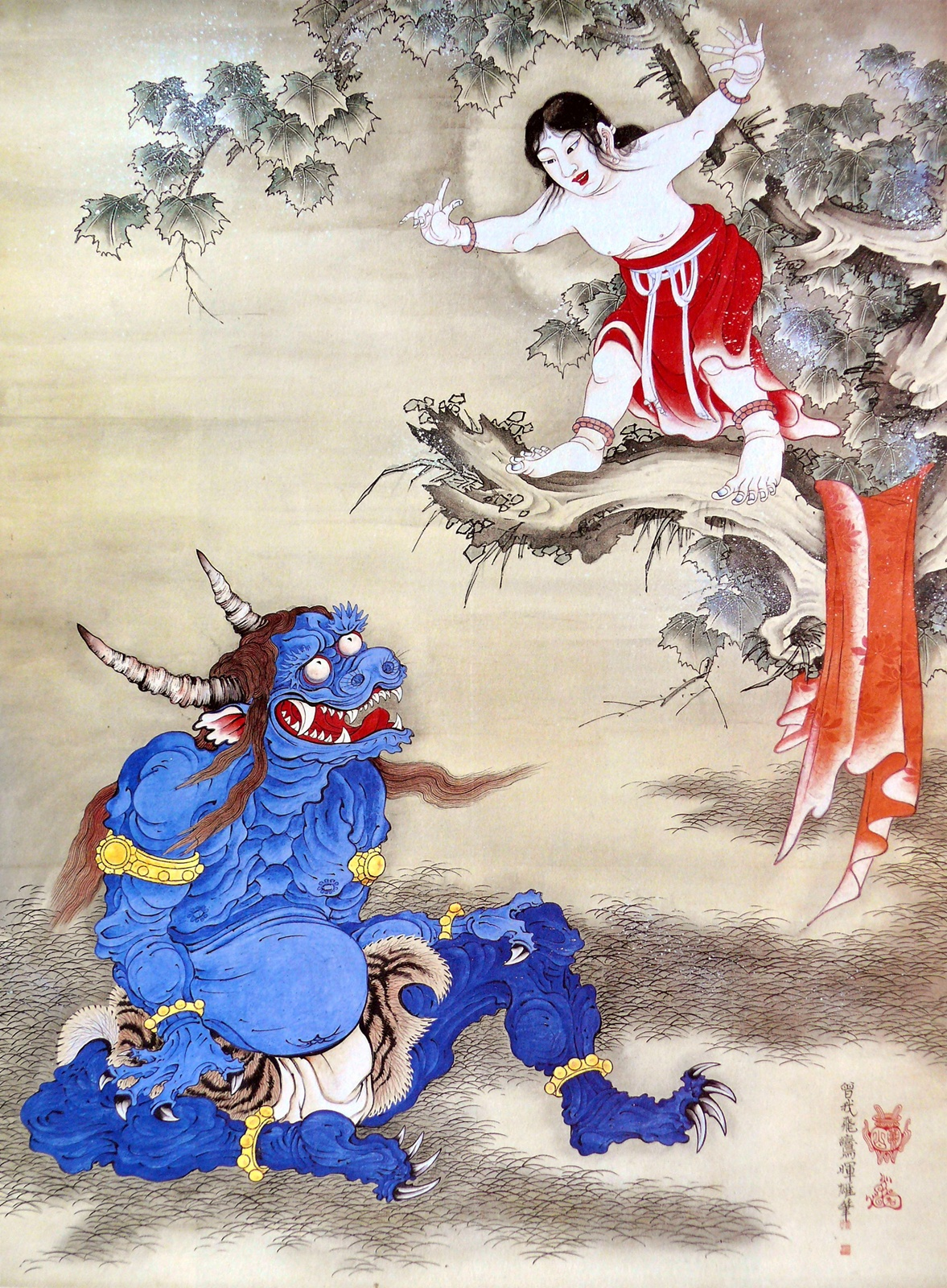
"The snow-covered mountain child", by Soga Shōhaku circa 1764

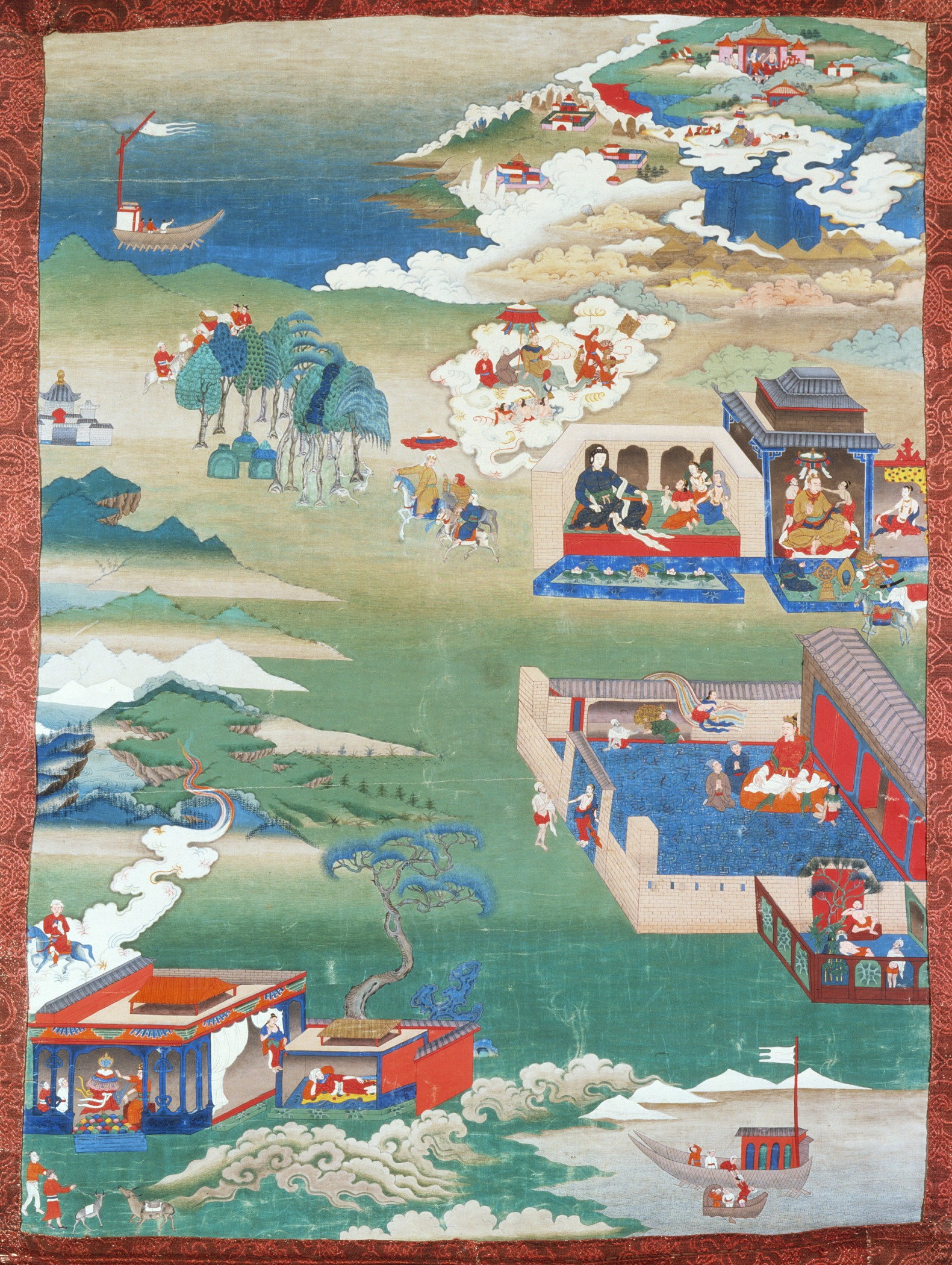
The Story of King Mandhatar; The Story of King Candraprabha; The Tale of the Island of Vadaradvipa, Tibetan Painting from an Avadana Kalpalata Jataka Series

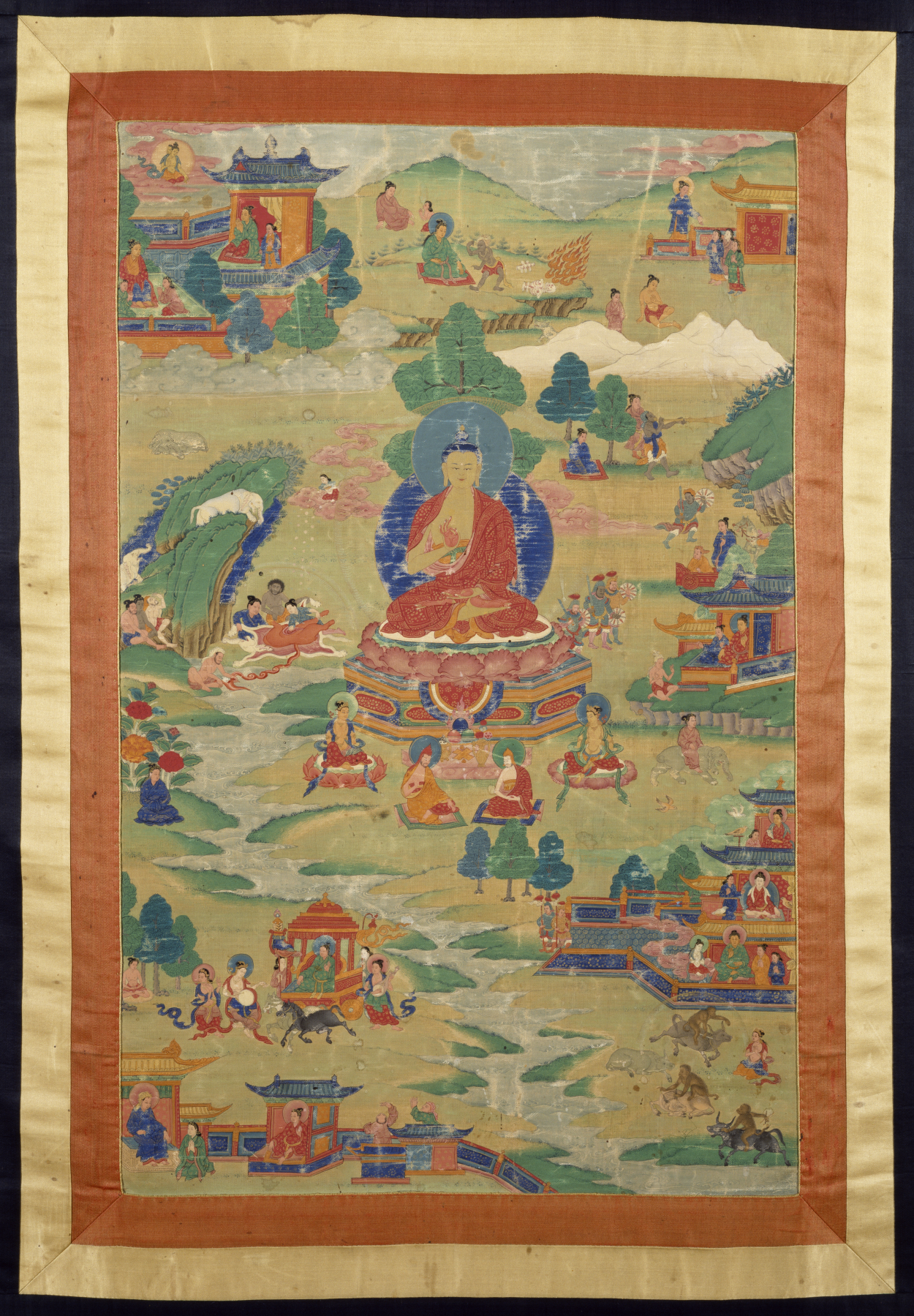
Tibetan Buddha Shakyamuni with "Jataka" Tales

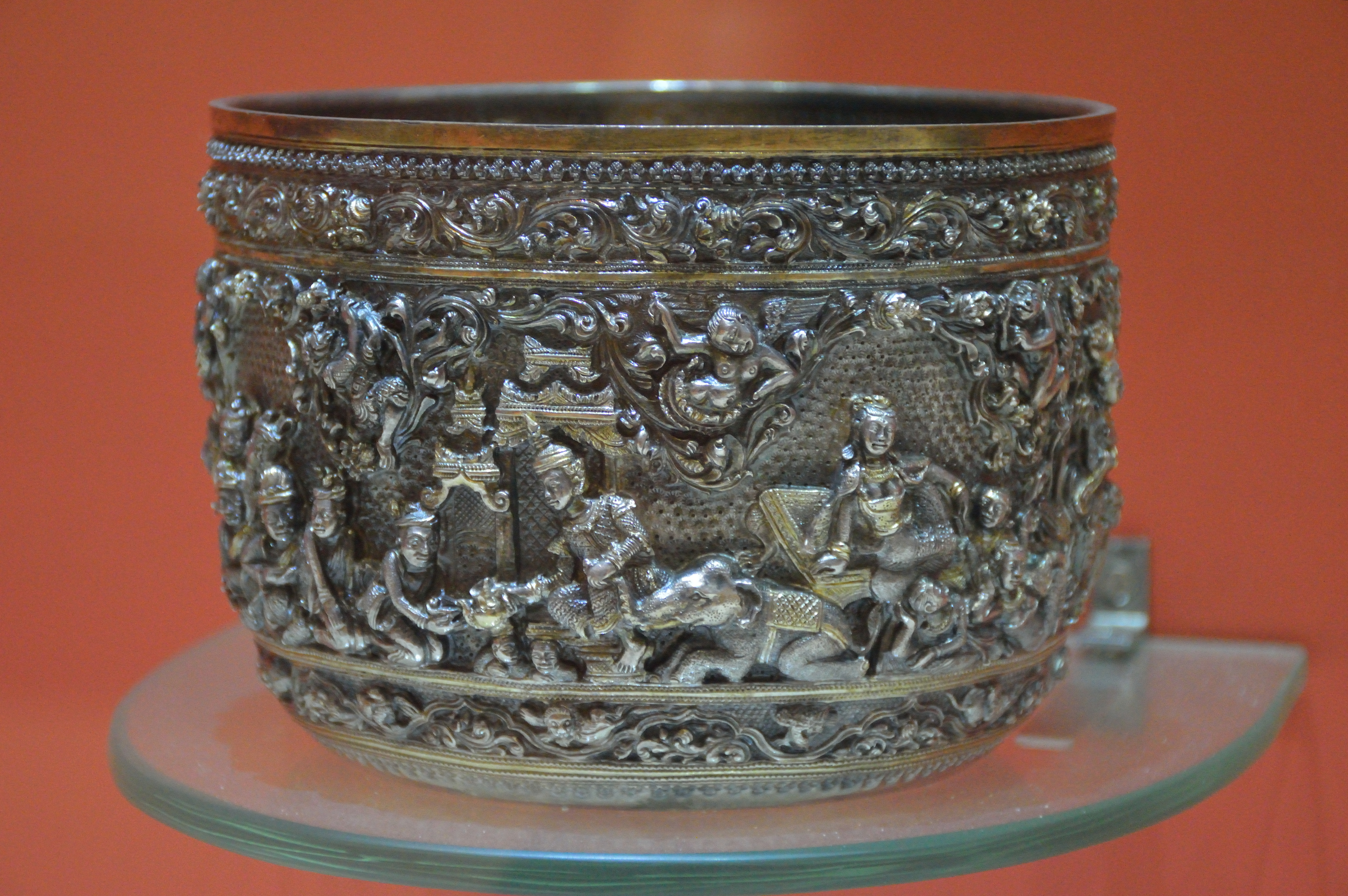
Round Bowl Depicting the Vessantara Jataka - Silver Alloy - 18th-19th Century CE - Myanmar.

== English Translations ==
The standard Pali collection of jātakas, with canonical text embedded, has been translated by E. B. Cowell and others, originally published in six volumes by Cambridge University Press (1895–1907) and reprinted in three volumes, by the Pali Text Society (Bristol). There are also numerous English translations of selections and individual stories from various sources.

Some of the main translations of jātakas available in English include:

- Bhikshu Dharmamitra, trans. Marvelous Stories from The Perfection of Wisdom: 130 Didactic Stories from Ārya Nāgārjuna's Exegesis on the Great Perfection of Wisdom Sutra. Kalavinka Press, 2008.
- Burlingame, E.W., trans., Buddhist Legends: Translated from the Original Pali Text of the Dhammapada Commentary, 3 vols., HOS 28–30, Cambridge MA, 1921.
- Cowell, E.B., & R.A. Neil, eds.,The Jātaka or Stories of the Buddha's Former Births, 6 vols., Cambridge UK, 1895–1907.
- Cowell, E.B., & R.A. Neil, eds., The Divyâvadâna: A Collection of Early Buddhist Legends, Cambridge UK, 1886.
- Cone, Margaret. The Perfect Generosity of Prince Vessantara: A Buddhist Epic, Clarendon Press (1977)
- Frye, Stanley. Sutra of the Wise and the Foolish, Library of Tibetan Works and Archives, 2006.
- Schiefner, F. Anton von. Tibetan Tales Derived from Indian Sources, translated from the Tibetan Kah Gyur (translated from the German by W.R.S. Ralston) (repr. Delhi: Sri Satguru, 1988)
- Hahn, M., ed., Poetical Vision of the Buddha's Former Lives: Seventeen Legends from Haribhaṭṭa's Jātakamālā, New Delhi, 2011.
- Horner, I.B., trans., The Minor Anthologies of the Pali Canon: Part III: Chronicle of Buddhas (Buddhavaṁsa) and Basket of Conduct (Cariyāpiṭaka), SBB 31, London, 1975.
- Horner, I.B., & H.S. Gehman, trans., The Minor Anthologies of the Pali Canon: Part IV: Vimānavatthu: Stories of the Mansions, SBB 30, London 1974.
- I. B. Horner, trans, Minor Anthologies III, 2nd edition, 1975, Pali Text Society, Bristol.
- Jayawickrama, N.A., trans., The Story of Gotama Buddha: The Nidāna-kathā of the Jātakaṭṭhakathā, Oxford, 1990.
- Jayawickrama, N.A., ed., Buddhavaṃsa and Cariyāpiṭaka, PTSTS 166, London, 1974.
- Jones, J.J., trans., The Mahāvastu: Translated from the Buddhist Sanskrit, 3 vols., SBB 16, 18 & 19, London, 1949–1956.
- Kern, H., ed., The Jātaka-Mālā or Bodhisattvāvadāna-Mālā by Ārya-Çūra, HOS 1, Boston, 1891.
- Khoroche, P., trans., Once the Buddha Was a Monkey: Ārya Śūra's Jātakamālā, London, 1989.
- Naomi Appleton, Many Buddhas, One Buddha: A Study and Translation of Avadānaśataka 1–40 (Sheffield: Equinox, 2020)
- Naomi Appleton and Sarah Shaw (trans.), The Ten Great Birth Stories of the Bodhisatta (Chiang Mai: Silkworm Press, 2015).
- Appleton, Naomi; Shaw, Sarah. The Ten Great Birth Stories of the Buddha: The Mahanipata of the Jatakatthavanonoana; Silkworm Books, (2016)
- Ñāṇamoli, The Life of the Buddha according to the Pali Canon, Kandy, 1992.
- Rotman, A., trans., Divine Stories: Divyāvadāna: Part 1: Classics of Indian Buddhism, Boston, 2008.
- Rotman, A., trans. Divine Stories, Part 2, Wisdom Publications, 2017.
- Tatelman, J., ed. & trans., The Heavenly Exploits: Buddhist Biographies from the Divyāvadāna, vol. I, New York, 2005.

== In other religions ==
Stories which are similar to the jātakas are also found in Jainism, which has stories focused on Mahavira's path to enlightenment in previous lives. The Jain stories include Mahavira's numerous forms of rebirth, such as animals as well as encounters with past liberated beings (jinas) which predict Mahavira's future enlightenment. However, a major difference here is that, while Mahavira gets a prediction of future enlightenment, he does not make a vow to become a jina in the future, unlike the bodhisattva Gautama. There is also no equivalent idea of a bodhisattva path in Jainism, in-spite of the existence of some narratives about Mahavira's past lives.

A similar collection of Indian animal fables is the Hindu Pañcatantra, which has been dated to around 200 BCE.

Some Buddhist jātakas were also adopted and retold by Islamic (and later Christian) authors, such as the 10th century Shia scholar Ibn Bābūya, who adapted a jātaka into a story titled Balawhar wa-Būdāsf, which became the Christian narrative of Barlaam and Joasaph.

== See also ==
- Aesop's Fables
- Avadana
- Avadanasataka
- Apadāna
- Divyavadana
- Kalila and Demna
- Mahanipata Jataka
- Mahāvastu
- Panchatantra
- Paññāsa Jātaka
- Puranas
- Robert Chalmers, 1st Baron Chalmers
- Edward Byles Cowell

== General sources ==
- John Strong (2004). Relics of the Buddha. Princeton University Press. ISBN 0-691-11764-0.
