= Aṭṭhakavagga and Pārāyanavagga =

Two small collections of suttas within the Pāli Canon of Theravada Buddhism

Aṭṭhakavagga–Pārāyanavagga
- SuttaCentral: Aṭṭhakavagga; Pārāyanavagga; OpenTipitaka Sutta Nipāta
- Type: Canonical text
- Parent: Sutta Nipāta
- Attribution: Bhāṇaka
- Aṭṭhakathā: Niddesa

The Aṭṭhakavagga (Pali, "Octet Chapter") and the Pārāyanavagga (Pali, "Way to the Far Shore Chapter") are two small collections of suttas within the Pāli Canon of Theravāda Buddhism. (Note: In the Pali canon, these chapters are the fourth and fifth chapters of the Khuddaka Nikaya's Sutta Nipata, respectively.) They are among the earliest existing Buddhist literature, and place considerable emphasis on the rejection of, or nonattachment to, all views.

== Textual concerns ==
=== Position within the Sutta Pitaka ===
The Aṭṭhakavagga and the Pārāyanavagga are two small collections of suttas. They are incorporated in the Khuddhaka Nikāya as subdivisions of the Sutta Nipāta, the collection of the words spoken by the Buddha. The suttas portray the Aṭṭhakavagga as an early collection of poetry; the Udāna and the Vinaya depict the Buddha asking a monk to recite Dhamma, and responding approvingly when he recites the Aṭṭhakavagga. This episode is found in a range of Vinayas preserved by different reciter traditions.

=== Dating ===
Some scholars regard the Aṭṭhakavagga and the Pārāyanavagga as being considerably earlier in composition than the bulk of the canon, and as revealing an earlier form of Buddhism. They are regarded as earlier because of elements of language and composition, their inclusion in very early commentaries, and also because some have seen them as expressing versions of certain Buddhist beliefs that are different from, and perhaps prior to, their later codified versions. In this thinking, the Pārāyanavagga is somewhat closer to the later tradition than the Aṭṭhakavagga. The Khaggavisānasutta (Rhinoceros Sutra), also in the Sutta Nipāta, similarly seems to reveal an earlier mode of Buddhist monasticism, which emphasized individual wandering monastics, more in keeping with the Indian sannyāsin tradition.

In 1994, a group of texts which are among the earliest Indian manuscripts discovered were found in Gandhara. These texts include a relatively complete version of the Rhinoceros Sutra and textual material from the Aṭṭhakavagga and Pārāyanavagga. In addition to these fragments, a Chinese translation of a version of the Aṭṭhakavagga, which combines the verses with narrative portions found in the Pāli tradition only in the commentary, is extant as T 198. This has been translated into English by Bapat.

== Interpretations ==
Speaking generally, the Aṭṭhakavagga and the Pārāyanavagga tend more strongly to emphasise the negative (i.e. those of abstention) sides of asceticism, (Note: Asceticism as a process of negating desire) and show a strong concern with letting go of views, regulating everyday bodily activities, and sexual desires. The Atthakavagga does not give a clear-cut goal such as nirvana, but describes the ideal person. This ideal person is especially characterised by suddhi (purity) and santi (calmness). The Aṭṭhakavagga also places considerable emphasis on the rejection of, or non-attachment to, all views, and is reluctant to put forward positions of their own regarding basic metaphysical issues.

=== Pre-Buddhist or proto-Madhyamaka ===
Gomez compared them to later Madhyamaka philosophy, which in its Prasaṅgika form especially makes a method of rejecting others' views rather than proposing its own.

=== Interpretation as heterodox ===
Tillman Vetter, although agreeing overall with Gomez's observations, suggests some refinements on historical and doctrinal grounds. First, he notes that neither of these short collections of suttas are homogeneous and hence are not all amenable to Gomez' proposals. According to Vetter, those suttas which do lend support to Gomez probably originated with a heterodox ascetic group that pre-dated the Buddha, and were integrated into the Buddhist Sangha at an early date, bringing with them some suttas that were already in existence and also composing further suttas in which they tried to combine their own teachings with those of the Buddha.

=== Interpretation as orthodox ===
Paul Fuller has rejected the arguments of Gomez and Vetter. He finds that

... the Nikayas and the Atthakavagga present the same cognitive attitude toward views, wrong or right.

Fuller states that in the Nikayas, right-view includes non-dependence on knowledge and views, and mentions the Buddha's simile of his dhamma as a raft that must be abandoned. He finds that the Atthakavagga's treatment of knowledge and wisdom is parallel to the later Patthana's apparent criticism of giving, holding the precepts, the duty of observance, and practicing the jhanas. In his view, both texts exhibit this particular approach not as an attack on practice or knowledge, but to point out that attachment to the path is destructive. Similarly, the text's treatment of concentration meditation is intended to warn against attachment to insight, and communicate that insight into the nature of things necessarily involves a calm mind.

Alexander Wynne also rejects both of Vetter's claims that the Parayanavagga shows a chronological stratification, and a different attitude toward mindfulness and liberating insight than do other works. (Note: Wynne devotes a chapter to the Parayanavagga.)

=== Theravada interpretation ===
The Theravada tradition has taken the view that the text's statements, including many which are clearly intended to be paradoxical, are meant to be puzzled over and explicated. An extended commentary attributed to Sariputta, entitled the Mahaniddesa, was included in the Canon. It seeks to reconcile the content of the poems with the teachings in the rest of the discourses. (Note: Thanissaro Bhikkhu, The Atthaka Vagga (The Octet Chapter): An Introduction. .) In some cases, the Theravada commentaries blunt or negate the rejection of all views by suggestion that the views being rejected are non-Buddhist views, while affirming the necessity of the views of the Eightfold Path.

== See also ==
- Presectarian Buddhism
- Early Buddhist schools
- Early Buddhist Texts
- Pāli Canon
- Sutta Piṭaka
- Khuddaka Nikāya
- Niddesa
- Gandhāran Buddhist texts
- Timeline of Buddhism
- Similarities between Pyrrhonism and Buddhism

== Sources ==
=== Printed sources ===
- Burford, Grace G. (1994), "Theravada Soteriology and the Paradox of Desire", in Buswell, Robert E. JR; Gimello, Robert M. (eds.), Paths to Liberation. The Marga and its Transformations in Buddhist Thought, Delhi: Motilal Banarsidass Publishers
- Burford, Grace G. (1996), "Culaniddesa", in Potter, Karl H. (ed.), Encyclopedia of Indian philosophies: Abhidharma Buddhism to 150 A. D., Motilal Banarsidass Publ.
- Fronsdal, Gil (2016), The Buddha before Buddhism: Wisdom from the Early Teachings, Shambhala Publications
- Fuller, Paul (2005), The Notion of Diṭṭhi in Theravāda Buddhism: The Point of View (PDF), Routledge, archived from the original on 2014-12-02
- Gomez, Luis O. (1976), "Proto-Mādhyamika in the Pāli canon", Philosophy East and West, 26 (2): 137–165, doi:10.2307/1398186, JSTOR 1398186, archived from the original on 2016-03-03
- Salomon, Richard (2000), A Gāndhārī Version of the Rhinoceros Sutra: British Library Kharoṣṭhi Fragment 5B, University of Washington Press, ISBN 0-295-98035-4
- Vetter, Tilmann (1988), The Ideas and Meditative Practices of Early Buddhism (PDF), BRILL, ISBN 90-04-08959-4
- Wynne, Alexander (2007), The Origin of Buddhist Meditation, Routledge
