= Pratyekabuddhayāna =

Enlightened beings in Buddhism

Pratyekabuddhayāna (Sanskrit: प्रत्येकबुद्धयान; traditional Chinese: 緣覺乘; ; pinyin: Yuánjué Chéng) is a Buddhist term for the mode or vehicle of enlightenment of a pratyekabuddha or paccekabuddha (Sanskrit and Pali respectively), a term which literally means "solitary buddha" or "a buddha on their own" (prati- each, eka-one). The pratyekabuddha is an individual who independently achieves liberation without the aid of teachers or guides and who does not teach others. Pratyekabuddhas may give moral teachings but do not bring others to enlightenment. They leave no sangha (i.e. community) as a legacy to carry on the Dhamma (e.g. Buddha's teachings).

== In early Buddhist schools ==
At least some of the early Buddhist schools used the concept of three vehicles including Pratyekabuddhayāna. For example, the Vaibhāṣika Sarvāstivādins are known to have employed the outlook of Buddhist practice as consisting of the Three Vehicles:

1. Śrāvakayāna
2. Pratyekabuddhayāna
3. Bodhisattvayāna

The Dharmaguptakas regarded the path of a pratyekabuddha (pratyekabuddhayāna) and the path of a bodhisattva (bodhisattvayāna) to be separate. One of their tenets reads, "The Buddha and those of the Two Vehicles, although they have one and the same liberation, have followed different noble paths."

In the Ekottarika-āgama parallel to the Isigili-sutta, where five hundred Paccekabuddhas live in the same aeon as the Buddha Gotama and only pass away shortly before his birth (Analayo).

== In Theravāda teaching ==
Pratyekabuddhas are said to achieve enlightenment on their own, without the use of teachers or guides, according to some traditions by seeing and understanding dependent origination. They are said to arise only in ages where there are no Buddhas and the Buddhist teachings (Sanskrit: Dharma; Pāli: Dhamma) are lost. "The idea of a Paccekabuddha … is interesting, as much as it implies that even when the four truths are not preached they still exist and can be discovered by anyone who makes the necessary mental and moral effort". Many may arise at a single time.

According to the Theravada school, paccekabuddhas ("one who has attained to supreme and perfect insight, but who dies without proclaiming the truth to the world") are unable to teach the Dhamma, which requires the omniscience and supreme compassion of a sammāsambuddha, who may even hesitate to attempt to teach.

=== In the Jātakas ===
Pratyekabuddhas (e.g. Darīmukha J.378, Sonaka J.529) appear as teachers of Buddhist doctrine in pre-Buddhist times in several of the Jataka tales.

== In Mahayana teachings ==
In the fourth-century Mahayana abhidharma work, the Abhidharma-samuccaya, Asaṅga describes followers of the Pratyekabuddhayāna as those who dwell alone like a rhinoceros or as solitary conquerors (Skt. pratyekajina) living in small groups. Here they are characterized as utilizing the same canon of texts as the śrāvakas, the Śrāvaka Piṭaka, but having a different set of teachings, the "Pratyekabuddha Dharma", and are said to be set on their own personal enlightenment.

A very early sutra, the Rhinoceros Sutra, uses the exact metaphor of Asaṅga. The Rhinoceros Sutra is one of the Gandhāran Buddhist texts, which are the oldest Buddhist texts known. This text is also present in the Pāli Canon; in the Sutta Pitaka, a Pali Rhinoceros Sutta is the third sutta in the Khuddaka Nikaya's Sutta Nipata's first chapter (Sn 1.3).

=== In Tibetan Buddhism ===
In the work written by Gampopa (1074-1153 C.E.), "The Jewel Ornament of Liberation, The Wish-fulfilling Gem of the Noble Teachings", the ‘Pratyekabuddha family’ are characterized as secretive about their teachers, live in solitude, are afraid of Samsara, yearn for Nirvana and have little compassion. They are also characterized as arrogant.

They cling to the idea that the unsullied meditative absorption they experience is Nirvana, when it's more like an island to find rest on the way to their actual goal. Rather than let them feel discouraged, the Buddha taught the Sravaka and Pratyekabuddha paths for rest and recuperation. After finding rest in states of meditative absorption, they are encouraged and awakened by the Buddha's body, speech, and mind to reach final Nirvana. Inspired by the Buddha, they then cultivate Bodhicitta and practice the Bodhisattva path.

== See also ==
- Arahant
- Dependent Origination
- Enlightenment in Buddhism
- Wisdom without a teacher
