= Petavatthu =

Buddhist scriptures in Pāli Canon

- SuttaCentral; OpenTipitaka
- Type: Canonical text
- Parent: Khuddaka Nikāya
- Attribution: Moggallāna; Bhāṇaka
- Aṭṭhakathā: Paramatthadīpanī (Petavatthu-aṭṭhakathā)
- Commentator: Dhammapāla
- Abbreviation: Pv

The Petavatthu (lit. 'Ghost Stories') is a Theravada Buddhist scripture, included in the Minor Collection (Khuddaka Nikaya) of the Pali Canon's Sutta Pitaka. It ostensibly reports stories about and conversations among the Buddha and his disciples, and it dates to about 300 BC at the earliest. It is composed of 51 verse narratives describing specifically how the effects of bad acts can lead to rebirth into the unhappy world of petas (ghosts) in the doctrine of kamma. More importantly, it details how meritorious actions by the living can benefit such suffering beings.

The scripture also includes the story of Mahā Moggallāna helping Sāriputta's mother from her previous life in the hungry ghost realm, his discussions with hungry ghosts, and his understanding of the realm. Before being born as a ghost, Sāriputta's mother was born in the hell realm. It also includes a story of how making offerings to the monks as a form of merit-making to increase the chance of a hungry ghost being reborn as a higher being.

The scripture gave prominence to the doctrine that giving alms to monks may benefit the ghosts of one's relatives seen in the Hungry Ghost Festival and ceremonies conducted in Cambodia, Sri Lanka, Thailand, and Laos. While regarded by scholars as a later text with relatively little doctrinal content or literary merit, the Petavatthu and a similar text, the Vimānavatthu, became popular sources for sermons due to the narratives on the effects of kamma contained in their commentaries.

== Legacy ==
The Moggallāna story of the Petavatthu was adapted in 6th-century China to form the Mahayana Yulanpen Sutra, which makes Mulian (i.e., Maudgalyāyana) its hero for his own mother, not Śāriputra's mother. Similar to its effect in South and Southeast Asia, the dissemination of the story led to the spread of a Ghost Festival throughout the Sinosphere.

A version of the Petavatthu's Maudgalyāyana story separately became a Chinese legend or folk tale known as "Mulian Rescues His Mother". However, instead of being reborn in the hungry ghost realm (peta) before finally being helped by Maudgalyāyana, the text contains the story of Maudgalyāyana's mother being reborn in a hell realm. This version of the story is considered a misunderstanding from the Theravādin point of view.

== Editions ==
- "Stories of the departed", tr Henry S. Gehman, in Minor Anthologies of the Pali Canon, volume IV, 1942, Pali Text Society, Bristol
- In Peta-Stories, tr U Ba Kyaw & Peter Masefield, 1980, Pali Text Society, Bristol; translation of the commentary, with the verses embedded; the PTS's preferred translation

== See also ==
- Khuddaka Nikāya
- Dhammapada
- Itivuttaka
- Sutta Nipata
- Theragatha
- Therigatha
- Udana
- Vimanavatthu
