= List of Khuddaka Nikaya suttas =

This is a list of the suttas in the Khuddaka Nikaya collection of minor suttas, part of the Tipitaka Buddhist Canon.

== Khuddakapatha ==
| Sutta number | Pali title | English title |
| Khp 1 | Saranagamana | Going for Refuge |
| Khp 2 | Dasa Sikkhapada | The Ten Training Rules |
| Khp 3 | Dvattimsakara | The 32 Parts |
| Khp 4 | Samanera Pañha | The Novice's Questions |
| Khp 5 | Mangala Sutta | Protection |
| Khp 6 | Ratana Sutta | Treasures |
| Khp 7 | Tirokudda Kanda | Hungry Shades Outside the Walls |
| Khp 8 | Nidhi Kanda | The Reserve Fund |
| Khp 9 | Karaniya Metta Sutta | Good Will |

== Dhammapada ==
The Dhammapada does not contain Suttas. It contains only 423 verses in 26 chapters.

| Sutta number | Pali title | English title |
| Dhp 1 | Cakkhupalatthera Vatthu | The Story of Thera Cakkhupala |
| Dhp 2 | Matthakundali Vatthu | The Story of Matthakundali |
| Dhp 3 & 4 | Tissatthera Vatthu | The Story of Thera Tissa |
| Dhp 5 | Kalayakkhini Vatthu | The Story of Kalayakkhini |
| Dhp 6 | Kosambaka Vatthu | The Story of Kosambi Bhikkhus |
| Dhp 7 & 8 | Mahakalatthera Vatthu | The Story of Thera Mahakala |
| Dhp 9 & 10 | Devadatta Vatthu | The Story of Devadatta |
| Dhp 11 & 12 | Sariputtatthera Vatthu | The Story of Thera Sariputta |
| Dhp 13 & 14 | Nandatthera Vatthu | The Story of Thera Nanda |
| Dhp 15 | Cundasukarika Vatthu | The Story of Cundasukarika |
| Dhp 16 | Dhammika-upasaka Vatthu | The Story of Dhammika Upasaka |
| Dhp 17 | Devadatta Vatthu | The Story of Devadatta |
| Dhp 18 | Cundasukarika Vatthu | The Story of Cundasukarika |
| Dhp 19 & 20 | Dvesahayakabhikkhu Vatthu | The Story of Two Friends |
| Dhp 21, 22 & 23 | Samavati Vatthu | The Story of Samavati |
| Dhp 24 | Kumbhaghosakasetthi Vatthu | The Story of Kumbhaghosaka, the Banker |
| Dhp 25 | Culapanthaka Vatthu | The Story of Culapanthaka |
| Dhp 26 & 27 | Balanakkhattasanghuttha Vatthu | The Story of Balanakkhatta Festival |
| Dhp 28 | Mahakassapatthera Vatthu | The Story of Thera Mahakassapa |
| Dhp 29 | Dvesahayakabhikkhu Vatthu | The Story of the Two Companion Bhikkhus |
| Dhp 30 | Magha Vatthu | The Story of Magha |
| Dhp 31 | Annatarabhikkhu Vatthu | The Story of A Certain Bhikkhu |
| Dhp 32 | Nigamavasitissatthera Vatthu | The Story of Thera Nigamavasitissa |
| Dhp 33 & 34 | Meghiyatthera Vatthu | The Story of Thera Meghiya |
| Dhp 35 | [[]] | |

== Udana ==
Exclamations

Bodhi Vagga
| Sutta number | Pali title | English title |
|---|---|---|
| Ud I.1 | Pathamabodhi Sutta | Awakening First |
| Ud I.2 | Dutiyabodhi Sutta | Awakening Second |
| Ud I.3 | Tatiyabodhi Sutta | Awakening Third |
| Ud I.4 | Nigrodha Sutta | |
| Ud I.5 | Thera Sutta | |
| Ud I.6 | Kassapa Sutta | Mahakassapa |
| Ud I.7 | Pava Sutta | |
| Ud I.8 | Sangamaji Sutta | |
| Ud I.9 | Jatila Sutta | |
| Ud I.10 | Bahiya Sutta | Bahiya |

Muccalinda Vagga
| Sutta number | Pali title | English title |
|---|---|---|
| Ud II.1 | Muccalinda Sutta | Muccalinda the Naga King |
| Ud II.2 | Raja Sutta | Kings |
| Ud II.3 | Danda Sutta | The Stick |
| Ud II.4 | Sakkara Sutta | Veneration |
| Ud II.5 | Upasaka Sutta | The Lay Follower |
| Ud II.6 | Gabhini Sutta | The Pregnant Woman |
| Ud II.7 | Ekaputta Sutta | The Only Son |
| Ud II.8 | Suppavasa Sutta | Suppavasa |
| Ud II.9 | Visakha Sutta | Visakha |
| Ud II.10 | Bhadiya Kaligodha Sutta | Bhadiya Kaligodha |

Nanda Vagga
| Sutta number | Pali title | English title |
|---|---|---|
| Ud III.1 | Kamma Sutta | Action |
| Ud III.2 | Nanda Sutta | Nanda |
| Ud III.3 | Yasoja Sutta | Yasoja |
| Ud III.4 | Sariputta Sutta | Sariputta |
| Ud III.5 | Kolita Sutta | Mahamoggallana |
| Ud III.6 | Pilindivaccha Sutta | Pilinda |
| Ud III.7 | Kassapa Sutta | Mahakassapa |
| Ud III.8 | Pindapatika Sutta | Alms |
| Ud III.9 | Sippa Sutta | Crafts |
| Ud III.10 | Lokavolokana Sutta | Surveying the World |

Meghiya Vagga
| Sutta number | Pali title | English title |
|---|---|---|
| Ud IV.1 | Meghiya Sutta | Meghiya |
| Ud IV.2 | Uddhata Sutta | High Strung |
| Ud IV.3 | Gopala Sutta | The Cowherd |
| Ud IV.4 | Junha Sutta | Moonlit |
| Ud IV.5 | Naga Sutta | The Bull Elephant |
| Ud IV.6 | Pindola Sutta | Pindola |
| Ud IV.7 | Sariputta Sutta | Sariputta |
| Ud IV.8 | Sundari Sutta | Sundari |
| Ud IV.9 | Upasena Vangantaputta Sutta | Upasena Vangantaputta |
| Ud IV.10 | Sariputta Sutta | Sariputta |

Sona Vagga
| Sutta number | Pali title | English title |
|---|---|---|
| Ud V.1 | Raja Sutta | The King |
| Ud V.2 | Appayuka Sutta | Short-lived |
| Ud V.3 | Suppabuddhakutthi Sutta | The Leper |
| Ud V.4 | Kumaraka Sutta | Boys |
| Ud V.5 | Uposatha Sutta | The Observance Day |
| Ud V.6 | Sona Sutta | Sona |
| Ud V.7 | Revata Sutta | Revata |
| Ud V.8 | Ananda Sutta | Ananda |
| Ud V.9 | Saddhayamana Sutta | Jeering |
| Ud V.10 | Panthaka Sutta | Cula Panthaka |

Jaccandha Vagga
| Sutta number | Pali title | English title |
|---|---|---|
| Ud VI.1 | Ayusankharavossajana Sutta | Relinquishment of the Life Force |
| Ud VI.2 | Jatila Sutta | |
| Ud VI.3 | Paccavekkhana Sutta | |
| Ud VI.4 | Pathamananatitthiya Sutta | |
| Ud VI.5 | Dutiyananatitthiya Sutta | |
| Ud VI.6 | Tatiyananatitthiya Sutta | |
| Ud VI.7 | Subhuti Sutta | |
| Ud VI.8 | Ganika Sutta | |
| Ud VI.9 | Upati Sutta | |
| Ud VI.10 | Tathagatuppada Sutta | |

Culla Vagga
| Sutta number | Pali title | English title |
|---|---|---|
| Ud VII.1 | Pathamabhaddiya Sutta | Bhaddiya First |
| Ud VII.2 | Dutiyabhaddiya Sutta | Bhaddiya Second |
| Ud VII.3 | Satta Sutta | Attached to Sensual Pleasures |
| Ud VII.4 | Dutiyasatta Sutta | Attached to Sensual Pleasures the Second |
| Ud VII.5 | Lakuntakabhaddiya Sutta | Another Discourse about Bhaddiya the Dwarf |
| Ud VII.6 | Tanhakkhaya Sutta | The Ending of Craving |
| Ud VII.7 | Papañcakkhaya Sutta | The Ending of Objectification |
| Ud VII.8 | Kaccana Sutta | Kaccayana |
| Ud VII.9 | Udapana Sutta | The Well |
| Ud VII.10 | Udena Sutta | King Udena |

Pataligamiya Vagga
| Sutta number | Pali title | English title |
|---|---|---|
| Ud VIII.1 | Pathamanibbana Sutta | Nibbana First |
| Ud VIII.2 | Dutiyanibbana Sutta | Nibbana Second |
| Ud VIII.3 | Tatiyanibbana Sutta | Nibbana Third |
| Ud VIII.4 | Catutthanibbana Sutta | Nibbana Fourth |
| Ud VIII.5 | Cunda Sutta | Cunda |
| Ud VIII.6 | Pataligamiya Sutta | At Pataliga Village |
| Ud VIII.7 | Dvidhapatha Sutta | A Fork in the Path |
| Ud VIII.8 | Visakha Sutta | Visakha |
| Ud VIII.9 | Pathamadabba Sutta | About Dabba Mallaputta First |
| Ud VIII.10 | Dutiyadabba Sutta | About Dabba Mallaputta Second |

== Itivuttaka ==
Ekaka Nipata
| Sutta number | Pali title | English title |
|---|---|---|
| Iti 1 | Lobha Sutta | |
| Iti 2 | Dosa Sutta | |
| Iti 3 | Moha Sutta | |
| Iti 4 | Kodha Sutta | |
| Iti 5 | Makkha Sutta | |
| Iti 6 | Mana Sutta | |
| Iti 7 | Sabbapariñña Sutta | |
| Iti 8 | Manapariñña Sutta | |
| Iti 9 | Lobhapariñña Sutta | |
| Iti 11 | Mohapariñña Sutta | |
| Iti 12 | Kodhapariñña Sutta | |
| Iti 13 | Makkhapariñña Sutta | |
| Iti 14 | Avijjanivarana Sutta | |
| Iti 15 | Tanhasamyojana Sutta | |
| Iti 16 | Pathamasekha Sutta | |
| Iti 17 | Dutiyasekha Sutta | |
| Iti 18 | Sanghabheda Sutta | |
| Iti 19 | Sanghasamaggi Sutta | |
| Iti 20 | Padutthapuggala Sutta | |
| Iti 21 | Pasannacitta Sutta | |
| Iti 22 | Mapuññabhayi Sutta | |
| Iti 23 | Ubho-attha Sutta | |
| Iti 24 | Atthipuñja Sutta | |
| Iti 25 | Sampajanamusavada Sutta | |
| Iti 26 | Danasamvibhaga Sutta | |
| Iti 27 | Mettacetovimutti Sutta | |

Duka Nipata
| Sutta number | Pali title | English title |
|---|---|---|
| Iti 28 | Pathamabhikkhu Sutta | |
| Iti 29 | Dutiyabhikkhu Sutta | |
| Iti 30 | Tapaniya Sutta | |
| Iti 31 | Atapaniya Sutta | |
| Iti 32 | Papakasila Sutta | |
| Iti 33 | Bhaddakasila Sutta | |
| Iti 34 | Anatapi Sutta | |
| Iti 35 | Pathamajanakuhana Sutta | |
| Iti 36 | Dutiyajanakuhana Sutta | |
| Iti 37 | Somanassa Sutta | |
| Iti 38 | Vitakka Sutta | |
| Iti 39 | Desana Sutta | |
| Iti 40 | Vijja Sutta | |
| Iti 41 | Paññaparihani Sutta | |
| Iti 42 | Sukkadhamma Sutta | |
| Iti 43 | Ajata Sutta | |
| Iti 44 | Nibbanadhatu Sutta | |
| Iti 45 | Patisallana Sutta | |
| Iti 46 | Sikkhanisamsa Sutta | |
| Iti 47 | Jagariya Sutta | |
| Iti 48 | Apayika Sutta | |
| Iti 49 | Ditthigata Sutta | |

Tika Nipata
| Sutta number | Pali title | English title |
|---|---|---|
| Iti 50 | Akusalamula Sutta | |
| Iti 51 | Dhatu Sutta | |
| Iti 52 | Pathamavedana Sutta | |
| Iti 53 | Dutiyavedana Sutta | |
| Iti 54 | Pathama-esana Sutta | |
| Iti 55 | Dutiya-esana Sutta | |
| Iti 56 | Pathama-asava Sutta | |
| Iti 57 | Dutiya-asava Sutta | |
| Iti 58 | Tanha Sutta | |
| Iti 59 | Maradheyya Sutta | |
| Iti 60 | Puññakiriyavatthu Sutta | |
| Iti 61 | Cakkhu Sutta | |
| Iti 62 | Indriya Sutta | |
| Iti 63 | Addha Sutta | |
| Iti 64 | Duccarita Sutta | |
| Iti 65 | Sucarita Sutta | |
| Iti 66 | Soceyya Sutta | |
| Iti 67 | Moneyya Sutta | |
| Iti 68 | Pathamaraga Sutta | |
| Iti 69 | Dutiyaraga Sutta | |
| Iti 70 | Micchaditthikammasamadana Sutta | |
| Iti 71 | Sammaditthikammasamadana Sutta | |
| Iti 72 | Nissaraniya Sutta | |
| Iti 73 | Santatara Sutta | |
| Iti 74 | Putta Sutta | |
| Iti 75 | Vutthi Sutta | |
| Iti 76 | Sukhapatthana Sutta | |
| Iti 77 | Bhidura Sutta | |
| Iti 78 | Dhatusamsandana Sutta | |
| Iti 79 | Parihana Sutta | |
| Iti 80 | Vitakka Sutta | |
| Iti 81 | Sakkara Sutta | |
| Iti 82 | Devasadda Sutta | |
| Iti 83 | Pubbanimitta Sutta | |
| Iti 84 | Bahujanahita Sutta | |
| Iti 85 | Asubhanupassi Sutta | |
| Iti 86 | Dhammanudhammapatipanna Sutta | |
| Iti 87 | Andhakarana Sutta | |
| Iti 88 | Antaramala Sutta | |
| Iti 89 | Devadatta Sutta | |
| Iti 90 | Aggappasada Sutta | |
| Iti 91 | Jivika Sutta | |
| Iti 92 | Sanghatikanna Sutta | |
| Iti 93 | Aggi Sutta | |
| Iti 94 | Upaparikkha Sutta | |
| Iti 95 | Kamupapatti Sutta | |
| Iti 96 | Kamayoga Sutta | |
| Iti 97 | Kalyanasila Sutta | |
| Iti 98 | Dana Sutta | |
| Iti 99 | Tevijja Sutta | |

Catukka Nipata
| Sutta number | Pali title | English title |
|---|---|---|
| Iti 100 | Brahmana Sutta | |
| Iti 101 | Caturanavajja Sutta | |
| Iti 102 | Asavakkhaya Sutta | |
| Iti 103 | Samanabrahmana Sutta | |
| Iti 104 | Silasampanna Sutta | |
| Iti 105 | Tanhuppada Sutta | |
| Iti 106 | Sabrahmaka Sutta | |
| Iti 107 | Bahukara Sutta | |
| Iti 108 | Kuha Sutta | |
| Iti 109 | Purisapiyarupa Sutta | |
| Iti 110 | Cara Sutta | |
| Iti 111 | Sampannasila Sutta | |
| Iti 112 | Lokavabodha Sutta | |

== Sutta Nipata ==
Uraga Vagga
| Sutta number | Pali title | English title |
|---|---|---|
| Sn I.1 | Uraga Sutta | |
| Sn I.2 | Dhaniya Sutta | |
| Sn I.3 | Khaggavisana Sutta | "A Rhinoceros Horn" or "The Rhinoceros" |
| Sn I.4 | Kasibharadvaja Sutta | |
| Sn I.5 | Cunda Sutta | |
| Sn I.6 | Parabhava Sutta | |
| Sn I.7 | Vasala Sutta | |
| Sn I.8 | Metta Sutta | |
| Sn I.9 | Hemavata Sutta | |
| Sn I.10 | Alavaka Sutta | |
| Sn I.11 | Vijaya Sutta | |
| Sn I.12 | Muni Sutta | |

Culla Vagga
| Sutta number | Pali title | English title |
|---|---|---|
| Sn II.1 | Ratana Sutta | |
| Sn II.2 | Amagandha Sutta | |
| Sn II.3 | Hiri Sutta | |
| Sn II.4 | Mangala Sutta | |
| Sn II.5 | Suciloma Sutta | |
| Sn II.6 | Kapila Sutta | |
| Sn II.7 | Brahmanadhammika Sutta | |
| Sn II.8 | Dhamma (nava) Sutta | |
| Sn II.9 | Kimsila Sutta | |
| Sn II.10 | Utthana Sutta | |
| Sn II.11 | Rahula Sutta | |
| Sn II.12 | Nigrodhakappa Sutta | |
| Sn II.13 | Sammaparibbajaniya Sutta | |
| Sn II.14 | Dhammika Sutta | |

Maha Vagga
| Sutta number | Pali title | English title |
|---|---|---|
| Sn III.1 | Pabbajja Sutta | |
| Sn III.2 | Padhana Sutta | |
| Sn III.3 | Subhasita Sutta | |
| Sn III.4 | Sundarikabharadvaja Sutta | |
| Sn III.5 | Mala Sutta | |
| Sn III.6 | Sabhiya Sutta | |
| Sn III.7 | Sela Sutta | |
| Sn III.8 | Salla Sutta | |
| Sn III.9 | Vasettha Sutta | |
| Sn III.10 | Kokalika Sutta | |
| Sn III.11 | Nalaka Sutta | |
| Sn III.12 | Dvayatanupassana Sutta | |

Atthaka Vagga
| Sutta number | Pali title | English title |
|---|---|---|
| Sn IV.1 | Kama Sutta | |
| Sn IV.2 | Guhatthaka Sutta | |
| Sn IV.3 | Dutthatheka Sutta | |
| Sn IV.4 | Sudadhatathaka Sutta | |
| Sn IV.5 | Paramatthaka Sutta | |
| Sn IV.6 | Jara Sutta | |
| Sn IV.7 | Tissametteyya Sutta | |
| Sn IV.8 | Pasura Sutta | |
| Sn IV.9 | Magandiya Sutta | |
| Sn IV.10 | Suribheda Sutta | |
| Sn IV.11 | Kalahavivada Sutta | |
| Sn IV.12 | Culaviyuha Sutta | |
| Sn IV.13 | Mahaviyuha Sutta | |
| Sn IV.14 | Tuvataka Sutta | |
| Sn IV.15 | Attadanda Sutta | |
| Sn IV.16 | Sariputta Sutta | |

Parayana Vagga
| Sutta number | Pali title | English title |
|---|---|---|
| Sn V.1 | Ajita Sutta | |
| Sn V.2 | Tissametetayya Sutta | |
| Sn V.3 | Punnaka Sutta | |
| Sn V.4 | Mettagu Sutta | |
| Sn V.5 | Dhotuka Sutta | |
| Sn V.6 | Upasiva Sutta | |
| Sn V.7 | Nanda Sutta | |
| Sn V.8 | Hemaka Sutta | |
| Sn V.9 | Todeyya Sutta | |
| Sn V.10 | Kappa Sutta | |
| Sn V.11 | Jatukanni Sutta | |
| Sn V.12 | Bhadravudha Sutta | |
| Sn V.13 | Udaya Sutta | |
| Sn V.14 | Posala Sutta | |
| Sn V.15 | Mogharaja Sutta | |
| Sn V.16 | Pingiya Sutta | |

== See also ==
- List of suttas
  - List of Digha Nikaya suttas
  - List of Majjhima Nikaya suttas
  - List of Samyutta Nikaya suttas
  - List of Anguttara Nikaya suttas
  - List of Khuddaka Nikaya suttas
