= Niddesa =

Buddhist scripture

- SuttaCentral: Mahāniddesa; Cūḷaniddesa; OpenTipitaka: Mahāniddesa; Cūḷaniddesa
- Type: Canonical text
- Parent: Khuddaka Nikāya
- Contains: Mahāniddesa; Cūḷaniddesa
- Commentary on: Aṭṭhakavagga and Pārāyanavagga
- Attribution: Sāriputta; Bhāṇaka
- Aṭṭhakathā: Saddhammapajotikā (Mahāniddesa-aṭṭhakathā, Cūḷaniddesa-aṭṭhakathā)
- Commentator: Upasena
- Abbreviation: Nd; Nidd; Mahā Niddesa: Mnd; Nidd I Cūḷa Niddesa: Cnd; Nidd II

The Niddesa (abbrev., "Nidd") is a Buddhist scripture, part of the Pali Canon of Theravada Buddhism. It is included in the Sutta Pitaka's Khuddaka Nikaya. It is in the form of a commentary on parts of the Suttanipata. The tradition ascribes it to the Buddha's disciple Sariputta. It is divided into two parts:

- Maha Niddesa (mahā-) (abbrev., "Nidd I" or "Nd1"), commenting on the Atthaka Vagga ("Octet Chapter," Sn 4);
- Culla or Cula Niddesa (cūḷa-) (abbrev., "Nidd II" or "Nd2"), commenting on the Parayana Vagga ("Way to the Far Shore Chapter,"Sn 5) and Khaggavisana Sutta ("Rhinoceros Horn Discourse," Sn 1.3).

This text is believed to have been most likely composed no later than the 1st century BC.

== Sources ==
- Hinüber, Oskar von (2000). A Handbook of Pāli Literature. Berlin: Walter de Gruyter. ISBN 3-11-016738-7.
- De la Vallee Poussin, L., Thomas, E.J., ed. (1916), "Niddesa I, Mahaniddesa", Vol. 1, The Pali Text Society, London, Oxford University Press. (Pali edition)
- De la Vallee Poussin, L., Thomas, E.J., ed. (1917), "Niddesa I, Mahaniddesa", Vol. 2, The Pali Text Society, London, Oxford University Press. (Pali edition)
- De la Vallee Poussin, L., Thomas, E.J., ed. (1916), "Niddesa II, Cullaniddesa", Vol. 3, The Pali Text Society, London, Oxford University Press. (Pali edition)

== See also ==
- Atthakavagga and Parayanavagga
- Khaggavisana Sutta
- Sutta Nipata
