= Sutta Nipata =

Buddhist scripture, sutta collection in the Khuddaka Nikāya of the Pāli Canon

Sutta Nipāta
- SuttaCentral; OpenTipitaka
- Type: Canonical text
- Parent: Khuddaka Nikāya
- Contains: Uragavagga, Cūḷavagga, Mahāvagga, Aṭṭhakavagga and Pārāyanavagga
- Attribution: Bhāṇaka
- Aṭṭhakathā: Paramatthajotikā (Suttanipāta-aṭṭhakathā)
- Commentator: Buddhaghosa
- Abbreviation: Snp; Sn (Note: When referring to a sutta from the Sutta Nipāta, the case-sensitive abbreviation 'Sn' is usually used. This abbreviation is distinguished from the abbreviation 'SN' which traditionally refers to the Saṃyutta Nikāya of the Pāli Canon.)

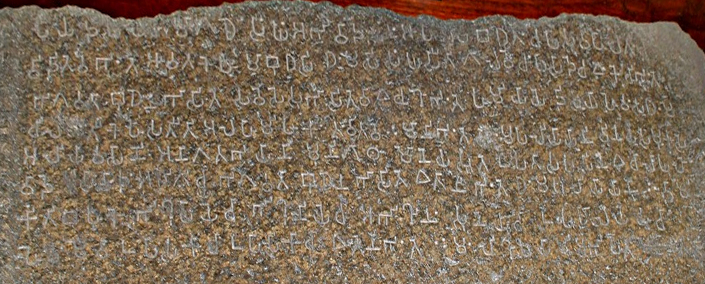
Ashoka Minor Rock Edict, inscription No. 3, Bhabru Rock Edicts, Jaipur district, India.

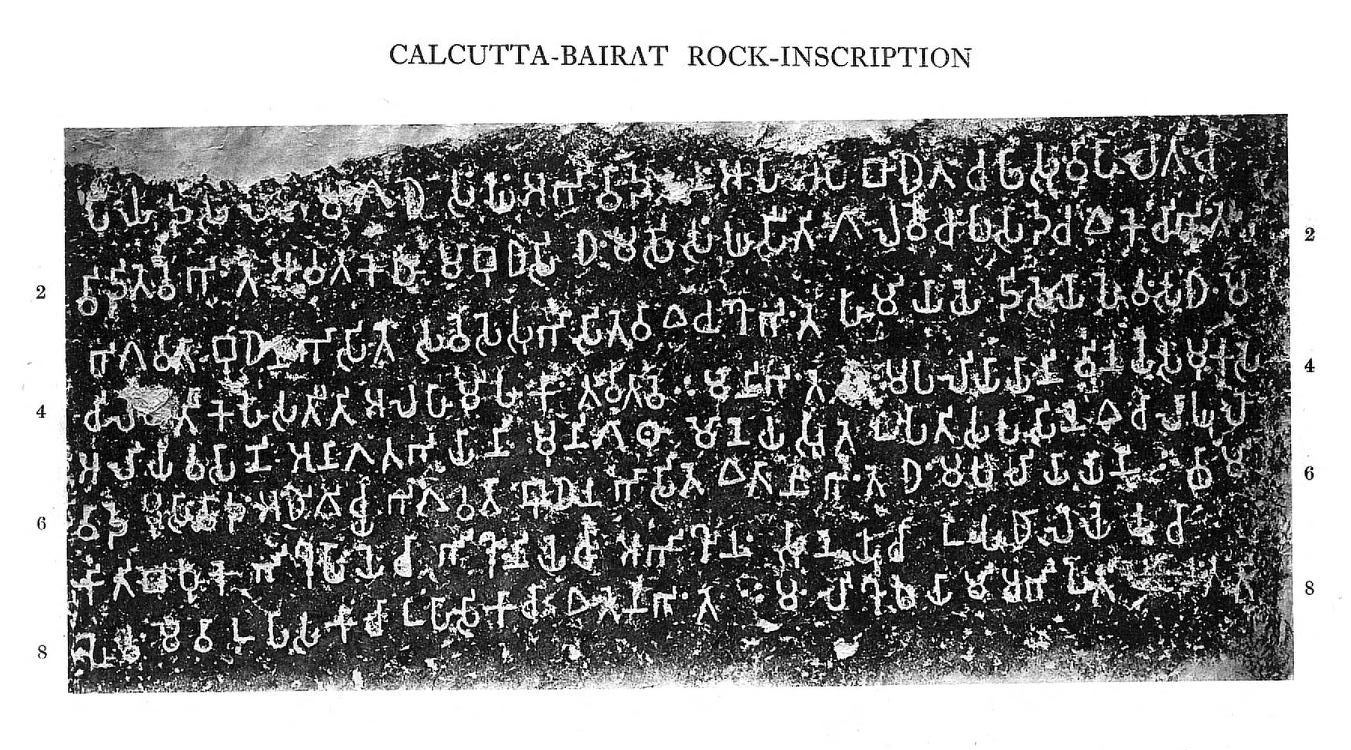
Ashoka Inscriptions, Bairat Temple, Rajasthan, India.

The Sutta Nipāta (Note: When referencing suttas from the Sutta Nipāta the case-sensitive abbreviation "Sn" is used. This is distinguished from the abbreviation "SN" which traditionally refers to the Pāli canon's Saṃyutta Nikāya.) (lit. 'Sections of the Suttas') is a Buddhist scripture, a sutta collection in the Khuddaka Nikāya, part of the Sutta Piṭaka of the Pāli Canon of Theravāda Buddhism. Sutta Nipata is a collection of discourses of Buddha. It is part of an early corpus of Buddhist literature. Robert Chalmers explains that sutta means a consecutive thread of teaching and Hermann Oldenberg explained that nipata denotes a small collection.

== Antiquity ==
Chalmers says that the materials of the Sutta Nipāta are not of equal antiquity but it contains some of the oldest Buddhist compositions. Bharat Singh Upadhyaya, Maurice Winternitz, and Hajime Nakamura are other prominent Buddhist scholars who regard its poetry to have originated in the beginnings of Buddhism. A commentary on Sutta Nipāta, called Niddesa, is included in the canon itself which points to the antiquity of the text.

The Bhabru Rock Edicts or Bairat Temple inscription of Ashoka also mentions many texts from this scripture.

== Sections ==
The Sutta Nipāta is divided into five sections:

- I. Uraga Vagga ("The Chapter on the Serpent") : 12 suttas;
- II. Cūḷa Vagga ("The Minor Chapter") : 14 suttas;
- III. Mahā Vagga ("The Great Chapter") : 12 suttas;
- IV. Aṭṭhakavagga Vagga ("The Chapter of Octads") : 16 suttas;
- V. Pārāyana Vagga ( "The Chapter on the Way Beyond") : 16 suttas (plus Introductory and Epilogue).

I. Uraga Vagga ("The Chapter on the Serpent") (Note: Sutta names, spellings, and translations are taken from Bodhi Bhikku, The Suttanipāta—other translators may have made different choices.)

Sutta number	Pāli title	English title (Note: Where no translation is given, the sutta is named after a person.)
Sn I.1	Uraga Sutta	"The Serpent"
Sn I.2	Dhaniya Sutta	"Discourse to Dhaniya"
Sn I.3	Khaggavisāṇa Sutta	"The Rhinoceros"
Sn I.4	Kasibhāradvāja Sutta	"Brahman Kasibharadvaj"
Sn I.5	Cunda Sutta	"Discourse to Cunda"
Sn I.6	Parābhava Sutta	"Downfall"
Sn I.7	Vasala Sutta	"The Outcast"
Sn I.8	Mettā Sutta	"Loving-Kindness"
Sn I.9	Hemavata Sutta	"Discourse to Hemvata"
Sn I.10	Āḷavaka Sutta	"Discourse to Yakkha Alavaka"
Sn I.11	Vijaya Sutta	"Discourse on Disillusionment of the Body"
Sn I.12	Muni Sutta	"Discourse on the Sage"

II. Cūḷa Vagga ("The Minor Chapter")

Sutta number	Pāli title	English title
Sn II.1	Ratana Sutta	"Discourse on Three Treasures"
Sn II.2	Āmaghanda Sutta	"Carrion"
Sn II.3	Hiri Sutta	"Discourse on Friendship"
Sn II.4	Mahāmaṅgala Sutta	"Great Blessing"
Sn II.5	Sūciloma Sutta	"Discourse on Yakkha Suciloma"
Sn II.6	Dhammacariya Sutta	"Righteous Conduct"
Sn II.7	Brāhmaṇadhammika Sutta	"The Tradition of the Brahmins"
Sn II.8	Nāvā Sutta	"The Boat"
Sn II.9	Kiṃsīla Sutta	"What Good Behavior?"
Sn II.10	Uṭṭhāna Sutta	"Arouse Yourselves!"
Sn II.11	Rāhula Sutta	"Discourse to Rahula"
Sn II.12	Vaṅgīsa Sutta	"Discourse to Vangisa"
Sn II.13	Sammāparibbājanīya Sutta	"Proper Wandering"
Sn II.14	Dhammika Sutta	"Correct Life of the Mendicant"

III. Mahā Vagga ("The Great Chapter")

Sutta number	Pāli title	English title
Sn III.1	Pabbajjā Sutta	"The Going Forth"
Sn III.2	Padhāna Sutta	"Striving"
Sn III.3	Subhāsita Sutta	"Well Spoken"
Sn III.4	Sundarikabhāradvāja Sutta	"Discourse to Bharadvaja of Sundarika"
Sn III.5	Māgha Sutta	"Discourse to Magha"
Sn III.6	Sabhiya Sutta	"Discourse to Sabhiya"
Sn III.7	Sela Sutta	"Discourse to Sela"
Sn III.8	Salla Sutta	"The Dart"
Sn III.9	Vāseṭṭha Sutta	"Discourse to Vasettha"
Sn III.10	Kokālika Sutta	"Discourse to Slanderer Kokaliya"
Sn III.11	Nālaka Sutta	"Discourse to Nalaka"
Sn III.12	Dvayatānupassanā Sutta	"Contemplation of Dyads"

IV. Aṭṭhaka Vagga "The Chapter of Octads" (Note: Following Robert Chalmers, it is the term "octad" which is used here. In Pāli, the word "aṭṭhaka" means eighth/eightfold, (read online:)) (Note: Unlike R. Chalmers, the monk Ṭhānissaro Bhikkhu chose to translate by octet while specifying: "The name of the Aṭṭhaka (Octets) appears to derive from the fact that four of its poems (IV. 2-5) all of which contain the word aṭṭhaka in their titles—are composed of eight verses." Read online: The Octet Chapter (Aṭṭhaka Vagga). Note 1 .)

Sutta number	Pāli title	English title
Sn IV.1	Kāma Sutta	"Sensual Pleasures"
Sn IV.2	Guhaṭṭhaka Sutta	"The Octad on the Cave"
Sn IV.3	Duṭṭhaṭṭhaka Sutta	"The Octad on the Hostile"
Sn IV.4	Suddhaṭṭhaka Sutta	"The Octad on the Pure"
Sn IV.5	Paramaṭṭhaka Sutta	"The Octad on the Supreme"
Sn IV.6	Jarā Sutta	"Old Age"
Sn IV.7	Tissametteyya Sutta	"Discourse to Tissametteya"
Sn IV.8	Pasūra Sutta	"Discourse to Pasura"
Sn IV.9	Māgandiya Sutta	"Discourse to Magandiya"
Sn IV.10	Purābheda Sutta	"Before the Breakup"
Sn IV.11	Kalahavivāda Sutta	"Quarrels and Disputes"
Sn IV.12	Cūlaviyūha Sutta	"The Smaller Discourse on Deployment"
Sn IV.13	Mahāviyūha Sutta	"The Greater Discourse on Deployment"
Sn IV.14	Tuvaṭaka Sutta	"Quickly"
Sn IV.15	Attadaṇḍa Sutta	"One Who Has Taken Up the Rod"
Sn IV.16	Sāriputta Sutta	"Discourse to Sariputta"

V. Pārāyana Vagga ("The Chapter on the Way Beyond")

Sutta number	Pāli title	English title
Introductory verses		
Sn V.1	Ajitamāṇavapucchā	"The Questions of Ajita"
Sn V.2	Tissametteyyamāṇavapucchā	"The Questions of Tissa Metteyya"
Sn V.3	Puṇṇakamāṇavapucchā	"The Questions of Puṇṇaka"
Sn V.4	Mettagūmāṇavapucchā	"The Questions of Mettagū"
Sn V.5	Dhotakamāṇavapucchā	"The Questions of Dhotaka"
Sn V.6	Upasīvamāṇavapucchā	"The Questions of Upasīva"
Sn V.7	Nandamāṇavapucchā	"The Questions of Nanda"
Sn V.8	Hemakamāṇavapucchā	"The Questions of Hemaka"
Sn V.9	Todeyyamāṇavapucchā	"The Questions of Todeyya"
Sn V.10	Kappamāṇavapucchā	"The Questions of Kappa"
Sn V.11	Jatukaṇṇīmāṇavapucchā	"The Questions of Jatukaṇṇī"
Sn V.12	Bhadrāvudhamāṇavapucchā	"The Questions of Bhadrāvudha"
Sn V.13	Udayamāṇavapucchā	"The Questions of Udaya"
Sn V.14	Posālamāṇavapucchā	"The Questions of Posāla"
Sn V.15	Mogharājamāṇavapucchā	"The Questions of Magharāja"
Sn V.16	Piṅgiyamāṇavapucchā	"The Questions of Piṅgiya"
Epilogue		

== Context ==
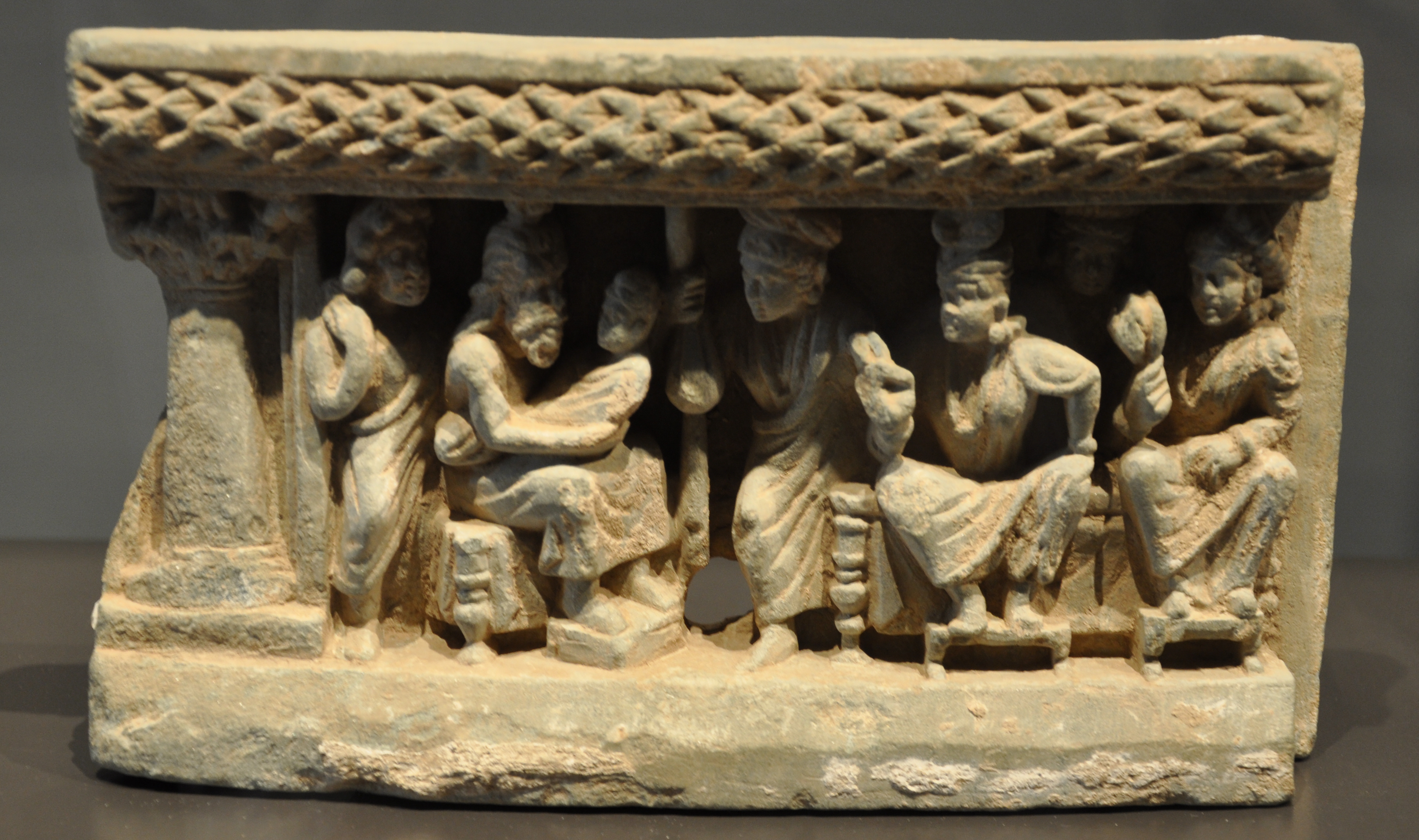
Asita predicting the greatness of Siddhartha Gautama as described in Nālaka sutta of Sutta Nipāta, Rietberg Museum, Zurich, Switzerland.

Some scholars believe that it describes the oldest of all Buddhist practices. Others such as the American Theravada Buddhist monk Bhikkhu Bodhi and K. R. Norman agree that it contains much early material. In the Chinese Buddhist canon, a version of the Aṭṭhakavagga has survived. Fragmentary materials from a Sanskrit version of the Nipata also survive. The Niddesa, a commentary in two parts on the contents of the Atthaka Vagga and portions of the Parayana Vagga, is included in the Pali Canon as a book of the Khuddaka Nikāya. This commentary is traditionally attributed to Śāriputra, and its presence in the canon is regarded as evidence of the relatively early composition of the Sutta Nipāta.

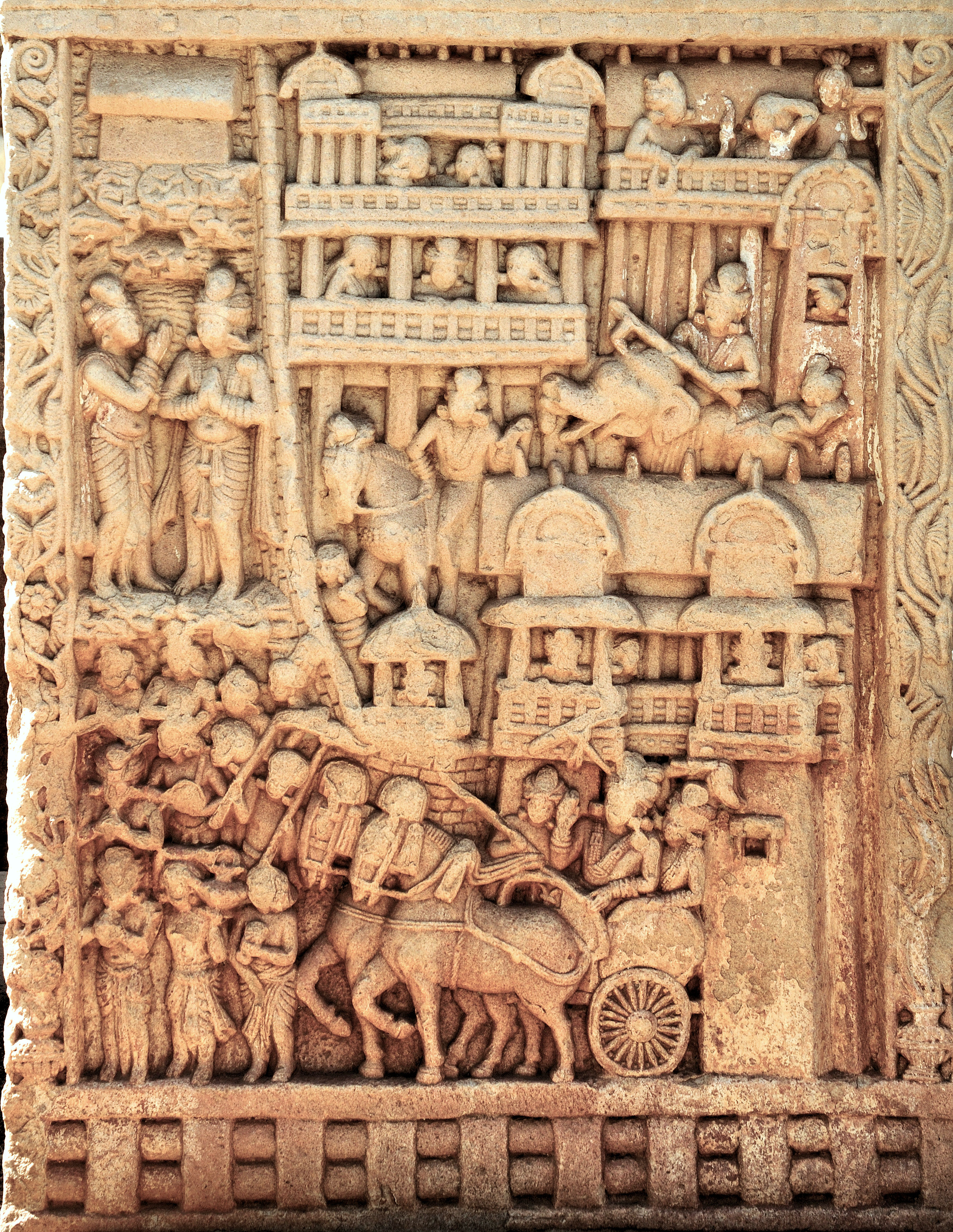
King Bimbisāra with his royal cortege issuing from the city of Rajagriha to visit the Buddha. Sanchi Stupa, India.

Many of the Buddhist legends originate in the Sutta Nipāta such as prediction by Asita on the birth of Siddhartha Gautama in the Nalaka sutta or the legendary meeting of King Bimbisāra with the Buddha.

Like the authors just mentioned, Hajime Nakamura also considers that the Sutta Nipāta is a very ancient collection. According to him, the last two parts, the Aṭṭhaka vagga (Sn. IV) and Pārāyana vagga (Sn. V), already existed during the lifetime of Gotama Buddha.

However, the American Theravāda monk Ṭhānissaro Bhikkhu takes a more nuanced view. He considers that nothing known to date allows us to conclude with certainty that these are texts of primitive Buddhism (without, however, ruling out the possibility).

== Presentation ==
The Sutta Nipāta (Pāli), which can be translated as "selection of instructions", "collection of suttas" or "collection of texts", is a collection of suttas from early Buddhism. It is the fifth book of the Khuddaka Nikāya, "small texts or small discourses", itself being the fifth part of the Sutta Piṭaka, of which it is probably the oldest part.

Like most early Buddhist collections, it is divided into sections (vagga), five in this case, and contains 70 suttas, plus a prologue and an epilogue, (Note: Note regarding the number of suttas in the Sutta Nipāta: Ṭhānissaro Bhikkhu indicates 71 or 72 instead of 70, depending on whether or not he includes the prologue and epilogue in his presentations.). Among the other canonical texts, only one collection is stylistically close to it, the Sagāthā Vagga section (SN.I), part of the Saṃyutta Nikāya (SN), several of whose suttas are versified in the form of dialogue.

It is distinguished from the other collections of the canon, because all the suttas that compose it are poems written in verse sometimes mixed with a few passages in prose (without any being only in prose). It has 1149 verses.

Three suttas from the Sutta Nipāta are among the most famous of ancient Buddhism, such as: (Sn.I.8) Mettā Sutta; (Sn.II.1) Ratana Sutta (Discourse on the Three Treasures); (Sn.II.4) Maṅgala Sutta (Discourse on the Great Blessing). They hold an important place in the ritual of the Theravāda tradition and are recited daily in monasteries, as well as on certain occasions. They are among the texts considered to be protective and sources of spiritual blessing.

== Multiple Occurrences in the Pāli Canon ==
Some suttas appear in several collections under the same titles, such as (non-exhaustive list):

- the Sela Sutta: (Sn.III.7) in the Sutta Nipāta (Sn) and (MN 92) in the Majjhima Nikāya;
- the Vāseṭṭha Sutta: (Sn.III.9) in the Sutta Nipāta and (MN. 98) in the Majjhima Nikāya
- the Mettā Sutta: (Sn. I.8 ) in the Sutta Nipāta and (Khp.9) in the Khuddakapāṭha (Khp);
- the Ratana Sutta: (Sn II.1) in the Sutta Nipāta and (Khp.6) in the Khuddakapāṭha;
- the Maṅgala Sutta: (Sn.II.4) in the Sutta Nipāta and (Khp.5) in the Khuddakapāṭha.

The same is true of many verses, which are found in two or even three collections, such as:

- verses 45 and 46 of (Sn I.3) Khaggavisāṇa Sutta (Alone like a Rhinoceros) which also appear in the Dhammapada (Dhp. XXIII) The Elephant, verses 328 and 329;
-in the Vinaya Pitaka II.Khandhaka 10.1, The Story of Dīghāvu (Note: Another reference in the Vinaya Piṭaka edited by the Pali Text Society: Vinaya I.350.) and in the Majjhima Nikāya.

In the Chinese Buddhist canon, a version of the Aṭṭhaka Vagga (Sn. IV), as well as fragments of a Sanskrit version of the entire Sutta Nipāta (Sn), have been found. (Note: These two versions were mentioned previously, section "Context".)

== Older sections ==
=== Section I. Uraga Vagga ===
The Khaggavisānasutta or Rhinoceros Sutra (Sn.I.3) also seems to reveal an early form of Buddhist monasticism, which emphasizes individual quest in a manner close to the Indian tradition of the Sannyasa. A fairly complete version of this sutra was found in the Gandhāran Buddhist texts, in 1994, among the oldest known Indian manuscripts.

=== Sections IV. (Aṭṭhaka Vagga) and V. (Pārāyana Vagga) ===
The two sections Aṭṭhaka Vagga (Sn. IV) and Pārāyana Vagga (Sn. V), are considered to be considerably earlier than the rest of the Pāli canon and would reveal an earlier form of Buddhist religion. This view is based on the literary aspect of the texts, their inclusion in the earliest commentaries, but also because they express Buddhist beliefs in a form different from their more common versions.

Luis Oscar Gómez notes that they deal respectively with the issues of sensual pleasures in general (not just sexual), and prajñā, the process of liberation. Buddhist meditation is approached from an angle closer to the practice of Samatha-Vipassanā (the first and second stages), although later sutras in the canon will teach a balance between the two.

There is also mention of the "world of formlessness", Ārūpyadhātu, which has led the author to emphasise the proximity of these teachings to those of the Madhyamika school of Mahayana, in which the notion of emptiness, Śūnyatā, plays a central role.

== Different analysis ==
As far as the relationship between the sections is concerned, Indianist authors have different interpretations: Luis Oscar Gómez considers that the five sections form a homogeneous whole; Tilmann Vetter considers that they constitute a composite whole, because, according to him, certain suttas (notably those of Aṭṭhaka Vagga) would have come from ascetic groups having preceded Siddhartha Gautama, and would have been integrated into the Buddhist corpus afterwards; and André Bareau takes the same line, seeing no logical order in the sections of the Sutta Nipāta, unlike the other collections of the canon.

Bhikkhu Bodhi, for his part, considers that:

For the Suttanipāta, as for all the texts of early Buddhism, the ultimate goal of spiritual training is said to be nibbāna.

== English translations ==
- The Silent Sages of Old, Suttas from the Suttanipāta by Ven. Ñāṇadīpa Mahāthera, 2018
- Tr V. Fausbøll, in Sacred Books of the East, volume X, Clarendon/Oxford, 1881; reprinted by Motilal Banarsidass, Delhi (date?) and by Dover, New York
- Buddha’s Teachings being the Sutta-nipāta or Discourse-Collection, tr. Robert Chalmers Delhi, India, Motilal Barnasidass Publishers, 1932 (reprint in 1997), 300 p., ISBN 8120813553, 9788120813557.
- Woven Cadences of Early Buddhists, transl. by E. M. Hare. Sacred Books of the Buddhists vol.15, repr. - London: Oxford University Press, 1947 Internet Archive (PDF 11.4 MB)
- The Group of Discourses, tr K. R. Norman, 1984, Pali Text Society, Bristol; the original edition included alternative translations by I. B. Horner & Walpola Rahula; these are currently available in the paperback edition under the title The Rhinoceros Horn and Other Early Buddhist Poems; the current edition under the original title omits these, but includes instead the translator's notes, not included in the paperback
- The Sutta-Nipāta, Tr H. Saddhatissa, Curzon, London/Humanities Press, New York, 1985
- Tr N. A. Jayawickrama, University of Kelaniya, 2001
- The Discourse Collection: Selected Texts from the Sutta Nipata, by John D. Ireland, Access to Insight (BCBS Edition), 2013. Available for free download here
- Bodhi, Bhikkhu (2017). The Suttanipāta: An Ancient Collection of the Buddha's Discourses and Its Canonical Commentaries. Wisdom Publications. ISBN 9781614294290.

== German translation ==
- Tr Nyanaponika Thera, Verlag Beyerlein & Steinschulte, D 95236 Stammbach, Germany, 3. Auflage 1996

== See also ==
- List of all Khuddaka Nikāya suttas
- Aṭṭhakavagga and Pārāyanavagga, widely considered some of the earliest Buddhist texts
- Rhinoceros Sutta, widely considered one of the earliest Buddhist texts

== Notes and references ==
=== Sources ===
- Bhikkhu Bodhi (2017). The Suttanipāta: An Ancient Collection of the Buddha's Discourses and Its Canonical Commentaries. Wisdom Publications, Somerville, Massachusetts, United States. p. 1116. ISBN 9781614294290.
- Robert Chalmers (1932). Buddha's Teachings: Being the Sutta-nipāta Or Discourse-Collection. Motilal Barnasidass Publishers. p. 300. ISBN 9788120813557.
- Laurence Khantipalo Mills (2015). The Sutta Nipāta (PDF). SuttaCentral, Turramurra, New South Wales, Australia. p. 355. ISBN 978-1-921842-17-7.
- Gómez, Luis O. (1976). "Proto-Mādhyamika in the Pāli canon". Philosophy East and West. 26 (2). University of Hawaiʻi Press: 137–165. doi:10.2307/1398186. JSTOR 1398186.
- Oskar von Hinüber (1996). Handbook of Pāli Literature (PDF). De Gruyter, Berlin. p. 257. ISBN 3-110-14992-3., passage quoted pp. 48–50 (§ 94-99).
- Hoernlé, Rudolf (1916). "The Sutta Nipata in a Sanskrit Version from Eastern Turkestan". Journal of the Royal Asiatic Society: 709–732. JSTOR 25189480.
- Nakamura, Hajime (1987). Indian Buddhism. A Survey with Bibliographical Notes. Delhi: Motilal Banarsidass. p. 423. ISBN 8120802721.. Reprint in 2007.
- Norman, K. R. (1983). Pāli Literature: Including the Canonical Literature in Prakrit and Sanskrit of all the Hīnayāna Schools of Buddhism (PDF). Otto Harrassowitz. p. 220. ISBN 3-447-02285-X.
- Salomon, Richard G.; Glass, Andrew (2000). A Gāndhārī Version of the Rhinoceros Sūtra. University of Washington Press. p. 234. ISBN 9780295980355.
- Singh, Upinder (2016), A History of Ancient and Early Medieval India: From the Stone Age to the 12th Century, Pearson, ISBN 978-81-317-1677-9
- Ṭhānissaro Bhikkhu (2016). Sutta Nipāta: The Discourse Group (PDF). Mettā Forest Monastery, Valley Center, California (licence CC BY-NC 4.0). p. 354., or .
- Tilmann Vetter (1988). The Ideas and Meditative Practices of Early Buddhism: Mysticism in the Aṭṭhakavagga. Brill Publishers, Leiden, Netherlands. p. 110. ISBN 9789004089594.

In French

- André Bareau (1985). En suivant Bouddha (in French). Paris: Éditions Oxus. p. 308. . Reprint in 2000 by Éditions Kiron Le Félin, Paris, 299 p.ISBN 9782866453640.
