= Jātaka (Pali Canon) =

Collection of stories on the past life of The Buddha

- SuttaCentral Jātaka OpenTipitaka: Jātaka 1; Jātaka 2
- Type: Canonical text
- Parent: Khuddaka Nikāya
- Attribution: Bhāṇaka
- Aṭṭhakathā: Jātaka-aṭṭhakathā
- Commentator: Buddhaghosa
- Abbreviation: Ja; Jat; J

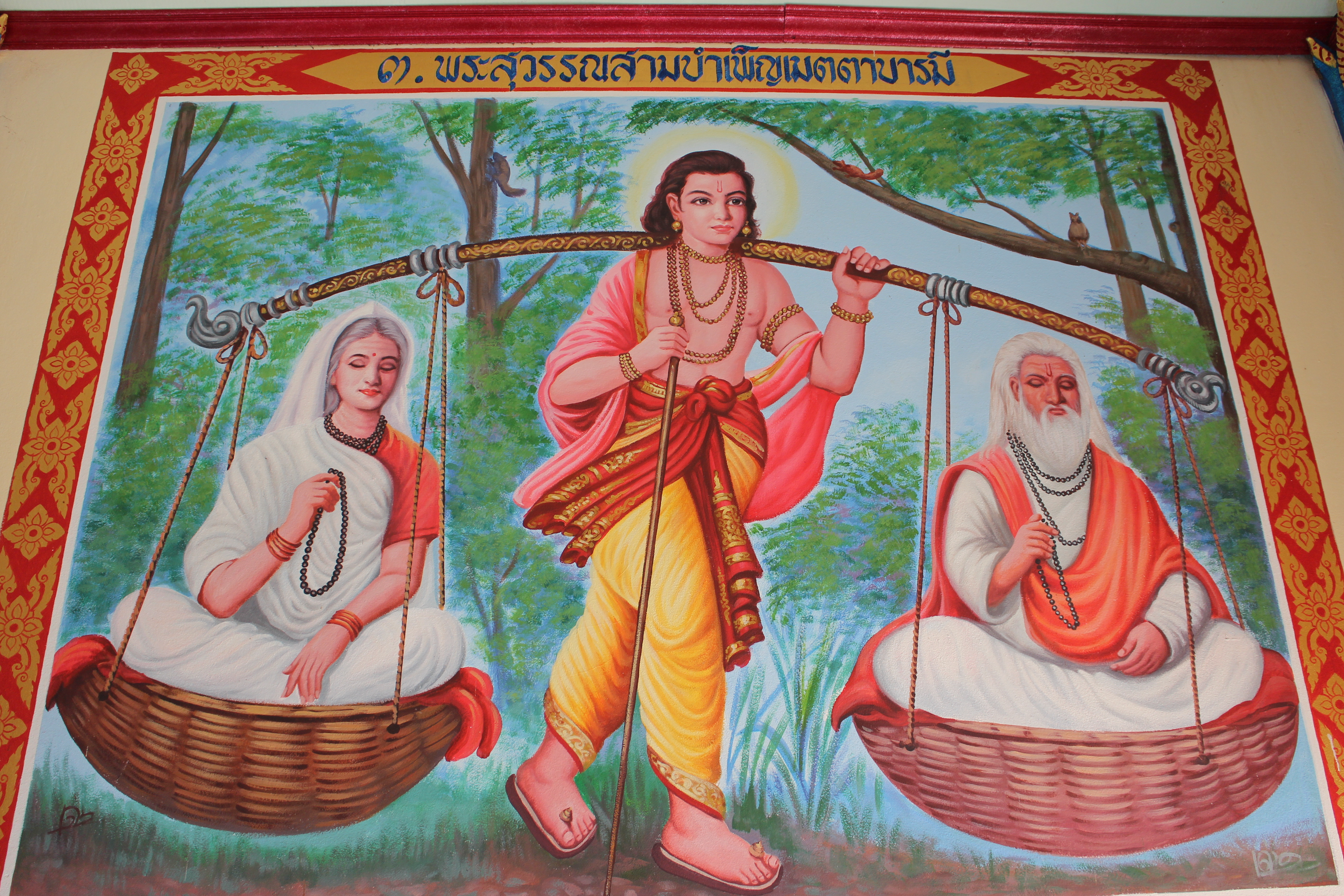
Sama cares for his blind parents, an illustration of one of the Mahānipāta jātakas

The Jātaka is a Buddhist scripture, part of the Pāli Canon of Theravāda Buddhism. It is included in the Sutta Pitaka's Khuddaka Nikaya. It comprises 547 poems, arranged roughly by an increasing number of verses. The various Indian Buddhist schools had different collections of jātakas, and the definitive Jātaka of the Pali Canon is one of the canonical collections that have existed within various Buddhist traditions. Some of the stories are also found in numerous other languages and media, such the Hindu Panchatantra.

== History ==
=== Early jātakas ===
Jātakas were originally transmitted in Prakrit languages and various forms of Sanskrit (from classical to Buddhist Hybrid Sanskrit). They were then translated into central Asian languages (such as Khotanese, Tocharian, Uighur, and Sogdian). Various jātaka stories and source texts were also translated into Chinese and Tibetan for the Tibetan and Chinese Buddhist canons. They were some of the first texts to be translated into Chinese. Kāng Sēnghuì (who worked in Nanking c. 247) was one of the first Chinese translators of the jātakas. Perhaps his most influential translation is the『六度集経』(Pinyin: Liù dù jí jīng; English: Scripture of the Collection of the Six Perfections).

=== Pali tradition ===
The various Indian Buddhist schools had different collections of jātakas. The largest known collection is the Jātakatthavaṇṇanā of the Theravada school. In Theravada Buddhism, the Jātaka is a definitive textual division of the Pāli Canon, included in the Khuddaka Nikaya of the Sutta Pitaka. The term Jātaka may also refer to Jātaka-aṭṭhakathā, the traditional commentary on this book that includes the actual tales, whereas the canonical Jātaka amounts to a few brief verses per tale which often only summarize the tale's virtues. Scholars date the tales in the commentaries between 300 BCE and 400 CE.

Within the Pali tradition, there are also many jātakas of later composition (some dated as late as the 19th century) outside those connected to the canonical Jātaka, but these are treated as a separate category of literature from the stories of the sanctified traditional commentary which dates from no later than the 5th century — as attested to in ample epigraphic and archaeological evidence, such as extant illustrations in bas relief from ancient temple walls. Apocryphal jātakas of Pali Buddhist literature, such as those belonging to the Paññāsa Jātaka collection, have been adapted to fit local culture in certain South East Asian countries and have been retold with amendments to the plots to better reflect Buddhist morals. According to Kate Crosby, "there is also a collection of jātaka of ten future Buddhas, beginning with Metteyya, which though less well-known today clearly circulated widely in the Theravada world."

=== Parallels ===
Many of the stories and motifs found in the Jātaka, such as the Rabbit in the Moon of the Sasajātaka (Jataka Tales: no.316), are also found in numerous other languages and media. For example, The Monkey and the Crocodile, The Turtle Who Couldn't Stop Talking and The Crab and the Crane that are listed below also famously featured in the Hindu Panchatantra, the Sanskrit niti-shastra that ubiquitously influenced world literature. Many of the stories and motifs are translations from the Pali but others are instead derived from vernacular oral traditions prior to the Pali compositions. At the Mahathupa in Sri Lanka all 550 Jataka tales were represented inside of the reliquary chamber. Reliquaries often depict the Jataka tales.

=== Famous stories ===
In Southeast Asia, the most important and widely known stories are the 10 stories of the Mahānipāta jātaka (Ten Great Birth Stories). These tales are considered to be the ten final lives of the Bodhisatta Gautama and are said to have been the completion of the 10 paramis or perfections. Of these, the Vessantara is the most popular. According to Peter Skilling, part of the reason for its popularity "was the pervasive belief, spread through the Māleyya-sutta and related literature, that by listening to this jātaka one could be assured of meeting the next Buddha, Metteyya."

== Overview ==
The Jātaka in Theravāda's Pali Canon comprises 547 poems, arranged roughly by an increasing number of verses. According to Professor von Hinüber, only the last 50 were intended to be intelligible by themselves, without commentary. The commentary gives stories in prose that it claims provide the context for the verses, and it is these stories that are of interest to folklorists. Alternative versions of some of the stories can be found in another book of the Pali Canon, the Cariyapitaka, and a number of individual stories can be found scattered around other books of the Canon.

The following list includes some important jātakas of the Pali Canon:

- The Ass in the Lion's Skin (Sīhacamma Jātaka)
- The Banyan Deer
- The Cock and the Cat (Kukkuṭa Jātaka)
- The Crab and the Crane
- The Elephant Girly-Face
- The Monkey King (Mahakapi Jataka)
- The Foolish, Timid Rabbit (Daddabha Jātaka)
- Four Harmonious Animals
- The Great Ape
- How the Turtle Saved His Own Life
- The Jackal and the Crow (Jambu-Khādaka Jātaka)
- The Jackal and the Otters (Dabbhapuppha Jātaka)
- The King's White Elephant
- The Lion and the Woodpecker (Javasakuṇa Jātaka)
- The Measure of Rice
- The Merchant of Seri
- The Monkey and the Crocodile
- The Ox Who Envied the Pig (Muṇika-Jātaka)
- The Ox Who Won the Forfeit
- The story of Romaka pigeon (Romaka Jātaka, previous life of the Buddha as a pigeon).
- Prince Sattva
- The Princes and the Water-Sprite
- The Quarrel of the Quails
- The sixteen dreams of King Pasenadi (Mahāsupina Jātaka)
- The Swan with Golden Feathers (Suvaṇṇahaṃsa Jātaka)
- King Sibi
- King Dasharatha
- The Tiger, the Brahmin and the Jackal
- The Turtle Who Couldn't Stop Talking (Kacchapa Jātaka)
- The Twelve Sisters
- The Wise and the Foolish Merchant
- Vessantara Jataka
- Why the Owl Is Not King of the Birds
