= Rhinoceros Sutra =

Buddhist scripture

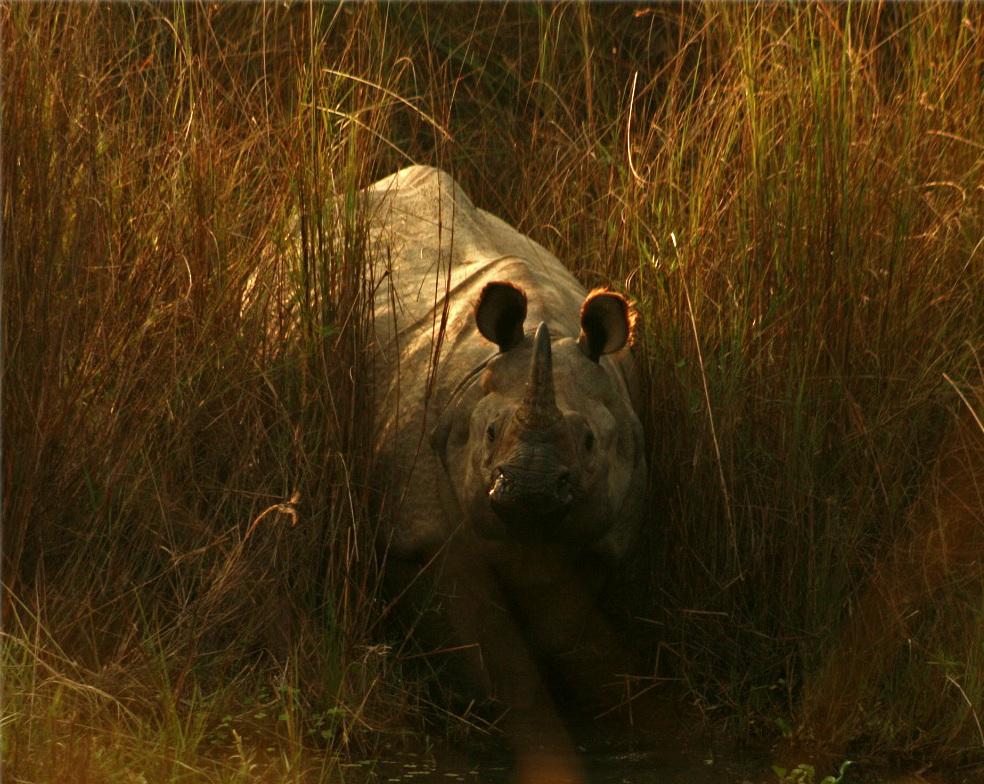
An Indian rhinoceros in the wild.

The Rhinoceros Sutra also known as The Rhinoceros Horn Sutra (Pali: Khaggavisāṇa-sutta; Sanskrit: Khaḍgaviṣāṇa-gāthā; Gāndhārī: Khargaviṣaṇa-sutra or Khargaviṣaṇa-gasa) is a very early Buddhist text advocating the merit of solitary asceticism for pursuing enlightenment as opposed to practicing as a householder or in a community of monastics. The goal of this was to become a pratyekabuddha, who wandered alone through the forest like a rhinoceros. It is possible this sutra is identified in the Chinese translation of the Mahāsāṃghika vinaya, and thus was also referred to with a Gāndhārī name similar to Pracegabudha-sutra.

== Origins ==
The Rhinoceros Sutra has long been identified, along with the Aṭṭhakavagga and Pārāyanavagga, as one of the earliest texts found in the Pāli Canon. This identification has been reinforced by the discovery of a version in the Gandhāran Buddhist texts, one of the oldest Buddhist (and, indeed, Indian) manuscripts extant. There is also a Buddhist Hybrid Sanskrit version of it in the Mahāvastu. The early date for the text along with its rather unusual (within community-oriented Buddhism) approach to monastic life have led some scholars to suggest that it represents a holdover from a very early stage of Buddhism.

== Themes ==
The scripture consists of a series of verses which discuss both the perils of community life and the benefits of solitude, almost all of which end with the admonition that seekers should wander alone like an Indian rhinoceros. The verses are somewhat variable between versions, as is the ordering of verses, suggesting a rich oral tradition that diverged regionally or by sect before being written down.

== Association with pratyekabuddhas ==
Traditional commentaries on the text have unanimously associated the Rhinoceros Sutra with the Buddhist tradition of pratyekabuddhas.

In the Abhidharma-samuccaya, a 4th-century (CE) Mahayana work, Asaṅga describes followers of the Pratyekabuddhayāna as those who dwell alone like the horn of a rhinoceros, or as solitary conquerors (Skt. pratyekajina) living in a small group. Here they are characterized as utilizing the same canon of texts as the śrāvakas who follow the Śrāvakayāna, namely the Śrāvaka Piṭaka, but having a different set of teachings, the Pratyekabuddha Dharma.

== Naming controversy ==
There is an ongoing dispute over whether the title, "sword-horn" sutra, is to be taken as a tatpuruṣa compound ("a sword which is a horn") or as a bahuvrīhi compound ("one who has a sword as a horn"). In the former case, the title should be rendered "The Rhinoceros-Horn Sutra"; in the latter case, it should be rendered "The Rhinoceros Sutra." There is textual evidence to support either interpretation.

In general, Mahayana traditions in India took the title to refer to an Indian rhinoceros, which is a solitary animal. The Theravāda tradition tended toward the "rhinoceros horn" interpretation, but there is some variance between Theravāda commentators, with some referring to the image of a rhinoceros rather than a rhinoceros horn.

== Location in Buddhist Canons ==
In the Sutta Pitaka, this Pali sutta is the third sutta in the Khuddaka Nikaya's Sutta Nipata's first chapter (Uragavagga, or the "Snake Chapter," named after the chapter's first sutta), and thus can be referenced in the Pali Canon as "Sn 1.3."

== See also ==
- Early Buddhist texts
- Pali Canon
- Sutta Piṭaka
- Khuddaka Nikāya
- Sutta Nipāta
- Gandhāran Buddhist texts
- Timeline of Buddhism

== Bibliography ==
- Rahula, Walpola; Asanga (2001). Abhidharma Samuccaya: The Compendium of Higher Teaching. Jain Publishing Company. pp. 199–200. ISBN 978-0895819413.
- Salomon, Richard G.; Glass, Andrew (2000). A Gāndhārī Version of the Rhinoceros Sūtra: British Library Kharoṣṭhī Fragment 5B. University of Washington Press. ISBN 978-0-295-98035-5.
- Thanissaro Bhikkhu (1997). "Sutta Nipata I.3, Khaggavisana Sutta: A Rhinoceros Horn".
- Jones, DT (2014). "Like the Rhinoceros, or Like Its Horn? The Problem of Khaggavisāṇa Revisited". Buddhist Studies Review. 31 (2): 165–178. doi:10.1558/bsrv.v31i2.165. S2CID 56273378.
- Norman, KR (1996). "Solitary as Rhinoceros Horn". Buddhist Studies Review. 13 (2): 133–142. doi:10.1558/bsrv.v13.i2.8762.
