= Vimānavatthu =

Part of Khuddaka Nikaya in the Pali Canon

- SuttaCentral; OpenTipitaka
- Type: Canonical text
- Parent: Khuddaka Nikāya
- Attribution: Moggallāna; Bhāṇaka
- Aṭṭhakathā: Paramatthadīpanī (Vimānavatthu-aṭṭhakathā)
- Commentator: Dhammapāla
- Abbreviation: Vv

The Vimānavatthu (Vimāna-; abbreviated as "Vv") is a Theravada Buddhist scripture, the sixth book of the Khuddaka Nikaya in the Pali Canon. Its name in Pali means "Stories of the Vimana," usually translated as 'heavenly abodes' or 'divine mansions'. The Vimanavatthu is an anthology of 83 short stories written in verse, divided into seven chapters or vagga. Each story describes the life and deeds of a character who has attained residence in a heavenly mansion, the "Vimana", due to their meritorious deeds.

== Overview ==
Each of the stories in the Vimanavatthu follows the same pattern, using the frame of the Buddha's disciple Mahamoggallana asking a deva the reason for their current residence in a divine abode. The deva then relates the good deeds in their previous birth that lead to their rebirth in the divine realm.

The text is generally regarded by scholars as a relatively late addition to the Pali Canon, possibly one of the last texts added to the Khuddaka Nikaya before the Canon was closed. Selected texts or stories from the Vimanavatthu may be earlier, a few being composed in the archaic Arya metre and others possibly reflecting reworkings of older stories, including borrowings from the Jataka collections. Its contents closely resemble a section of the Mahavastu, as well as a fragmentary Sarvastivada text from the Ksudrakagama called the Vimānāvadāna, suggesting an origin in an older collection of stories.

Narratives based on the Vimanavatthu and the Petavatthu, a similar text, were expanded into narratives in the commentary tradition and became a popular source of material for sermons. The collection as a whole was probably directed at lay Buddhists, and present a relatively simple view of karma where good deeds are rewarded by promising rebirth. However, many of the devas lament that they did not do even better and become fully enlightened.

== Translations ==
- "Stories of the mansions", tr Jean Kennedy, in Minor Anthologies of the Pali Canon, volume IV, 1st edn, 1942
- "Stories of the mansions", tr I. B. Horner, in Minor Anthologies IV, 2nd edn, 1974, Pali Text Society, Bristol
- In Vimana Stories, tr Peter Masefield, 1989, Pali Text Society, Bristol; translation of the commentary, with the verses embedded; the PTS's preferred translation

== See also ==
- Petavatthu
- Vimana
