= Uraga Sutta =

The Uraga Sutta ("The Snake") is a Buddhist discourse, or sutta, that opens the Pali Canon's Sutta Nipata. It gives its name to the first chapter, the Uragavagga.

== Contents ==
The sutta is composed of 17 stanzas. The first part of each stanza mentions something that is given up or overcome—anger, lust, conceit, etc.—and the second part is always the couplet "...that bhikkhu gives up the here and the beyond / as a serpent sheds it old worn-out skin," which is a simile for the first part.

Things given up include the Three poisons (stanza 14) and the Five hindrances (stanza 17).

== Commentary ==
In the traditional commentary to this sutta, the Paramatthajotika by Buddhaghosa, it is explained that each stanza was a statement of the Buddha to various students at various times.

Some of the stanzas appear in other Buddhist texts. Ten of them are found in the Gandhāran Buddhist texts.
