= List of suttas =

Suttas from the Sutta Pitaka of the Pali Canon.

- List of Digha Nikaya suttas
- List of Majjhima Nikaya suttas
- List of Samyutta Nikaya suttas
- List of Anguttara Nikaya suttas
- List of Khuddaka Nikaya suttas

== See also ==
- Buddhist texts
- Index of Buddhism-related articles
- Mahayana sutras
