= Theragatha =

Buddhist text

Theragāthā
- SuttaCentral; OpenTipitaka
- Type: Canonical text
- Parent: Khuddaka Nikāya
- Attribution: 264 theras; Bhāṇaka
- Aṭṭhakathā: Paramatthadīpanī (Theragāthā-aṭṭhakathā)
- Commentator: Dhammapāla
- Abbreviation: Thag; Th

The Theragāthā (Verses of the Elder Monks) is a Buddhist text, a collection of short poems in Pali attributed to members of the early Buddhist sangha. It is classified as part of the Khuddaka Nikaya, the collection of minor books in the Sutta Pitaka. A similar text, the Therigatha, contains verses attributed to early Buddhist nuns.

== Etymology ==
Theragatha is a Pali word, constructed from the words thera (elder, masculine) and gāthā (verse).

== Overview ==
The Theragatha consists of 264 poems, organized into 21 chapters. Chapters are based on the number of verses in the poem, but beyond chapter 16 the chapter headings are only a rough guide. Various figures for the number of total verses in the collection are given- the oral tradition claimed 1360, 1294 are mentioned in summaries within the text, but a plain count of the verses gives a number of 1279. This may be because different versions of the Theragatha were combined to produce the current version of the text.

While most of the verses are spoken by the monk to whom they are attributed, some seem to have become associated with them in other ways- some verses are addressed to the monk the poem is named for, and a collection of verses associated with Ananda contains a mix of verses recited by or to Ananda on various occasions. Several verses in the Theragatha appear elsewhere in the canon, attributed to the same monks.

Most of the monks in the Theragatha lived during the time of the Buddha, but the collection seems to have continued to grow until at least the Third Buddhist Council. The omission of similar verses that were included in the Milindapanha suggests that while chapters continued to be added to the Theragatha for a period of 300 years or so, the collection was ultimately closed and put in a final form.

A variety of early and late poetic meters are employed, and K.R. Norman suggests that the inclusion of miracle stories and congregations of gods are indicative of later additions. Some of the verses in the collection seem to mirror contemporary secular poetry of their time, with romantic lyrics replaced with religious imagery.

Notable texts from the Theragatha include the eighth poem of chapter sixteen, consisting of verses recited by the reformed killer Angulimala, and the third poem of chapter seventeen, in which the Buddha's cousin and retainer Ananda mourns the passing of his master. Many of the verses of the Theragatha concern the attempts of monks to overcome the temptations of Mara.

== Related works ==
A single commentary attributed to Dhammapala covers both the Theragatha and Therigatha. In one case, a poem appears to have been split with verses attributed to a monk appearing in the Theragatha, and verses attributed to his mother placed in the Therigatha.

Fragments of a Sanskrit version of the Theragatha preserved by the Sarvastivadin tradition, known as the Sthaviragatha, were discovered in Turkestan and published in 1961.

== Translations ==
- Theragāthā: Verses of the Elder Bhikkhus, translated by Bhikkhu Mahinda (Anagarika Mahendra), Bilingual Pali-English Second Edition 2022, Dhamma Publishers, Roslindale MA; ISBN 9780999078174.
- Psalms of the Brethren, tr C. A. F. Rhys Davids, 1913; reprinted in Psalms of the Early Buddhists, Pali Text Society, Bristol
- Elders' Verses, volume I, tr K. R. Norman, 1969, Pali Text Society, Bristol; the PTS's preferred translation; also available in paperback as Poems of Early Buddhist Monks, without the translator's notes (ISBN 0860133397)
- Verses of the Senior Monks, translated by Bhikkhu Sujato and Jessica Walton, 2019, SuttaCentral.
