= Charles Hucker =

American historian of China

Charles O. Hucker
- Born: June 21, 1919; St. Louis, Missouri
- Died: November 18, 1994 (aged 75); Odessa, Texas
- Education: University of Texas; University of Chicago (PhD)
- Spouse: Myrl Henderson
- Scientific career
- Fields: Sinology; Chinese history
- Workplaces: University of Chicago; University of Arizona; Oakland University; University of Michigan
- Thesis: The Chinese censorate of the Ming dynasty, including an analysis of its activities during the decade 1424–1434 (1950)

Chinese name
- Traditional Chinese: 賀凱
- Simplified Chinese: 贺凯
Transcriptions
Standard Mandarin
- Hanyu Pinyin: Hé Kǎi

Charles Oscar Hucker (Chinese: 贺凯; June 21, 1919 – November 18, 1994) was an American historian and Sinologist who was a professor of Chinese language and history at the University of Michigan. He was regarded as one of the foremost historians of Ming dynasty China and a leading figure in the promotion of academic programs in Asian Studies during the 1950s and 1960s.

== Biography ==
=== Early life and education ===
Born in St. Louis, Hucker graduated from the University of Texas, earning high honors despite working full-time in the university library. After marrying Myrl Henderson in 1943, Hucker served in the United States Army Air Forces for the final two years of the Second World War, where he rose to the rank of major and was awarded the Bronze Star Medal. His primary duties were as a historical officer for V Fighter Command of the Fifth Air Force, in which capacity he claimed to have compiled a classified three-volume history of aircraft and aircraft warning systems used in the war. He completed a Ph.D. in Chinese language from the University of Chicago in 1950.

=== Academic career ===
Hucker taught at the University of Chicago, at the University of Arizona, and then at Oakland University before joining the University of Michigan in 1965, where he was the chair of the Department of Far Eastern Languages and Literatures. Throughout his teaching career, Hucker was an active member of many professional associations: he was a fellow of the Rockefeller Foundation, a senior fellow of the National Endowment for the Humanities, and a frequent consultant to the U.S. Office of Education, foundations, and various colleges and universities. During the 1950s and 1960s, he became a leading promoter of academic programs in Asian Studies in the U.S.

Hucker was awarded an honorary doctorate of humanities from Oakland University in 1974, and in 1979 was among a small number of American scholars of Chinese history who visited scholarly centers in China under the joint auspices of the U.S. National Academy of Sciences and the Chinese Academy of Social Sciences.

=== Ming dynasty specialist ===
The subject of Hucker's Ph.D. dissertation had been the censorate of the Ming dynasty, which he revised and expanded for separate publication in 1966 as The Censorial System of Ming China. In 2021, the book was published in Chinese translation. Hucker saw the censorate as a third branch of government, on equal footing with the civil and military bureaucracies, beholden to the traditional state Confucian orthodoxy moreso than to any other component of the state apparatus. He chaired the Committee for the Ming Biographical Dictionary Project until the publication in 1976 of its target work, the Dictionary of Ming Biography, a two-volume English language reference work, to which he also contributed twelve biographies.

Hucker also authored China's Imperial Past, a history of Imperial China intended for general readership. He was a contributor to Encyclopedia Americana, Encyclopædia Britannica – where he was the primary contributor to the articles on "China" and "Yongle" – and The Cambridge History of China, for which he wrote the chapter "Ming Government" for volume eight of the series, published after his death. His China to 1850: A Short History, published in 1975, was widely used as a college text.

=== A Dictionary of Official Titles in Imperial China ===
In 1985, after nearly a decade in development, Hucker's Dictionary of Official Titles in Imperial China was published. Regarded as the most comprehensive guide to traditional Chinese government in a Western language, it translated and described the roles of every official title encountered in the historical texts of Imperial China, from legendary offices recorded in the Rites of Zhou up through the mid-Qing dynasty. Since the duties of an office evolved more rapidly than their titles changed, this involved multiple definitions for many entries, which numbered over 8,000. Unofficial titles such as bespoke military commands or landless enfeoffments were not included.

The dictionary was composed by Hucker on his personal computer, without assistance from the publisher, an unusual and tedious process for the time. Several notable experts in the field wrote reviews of the book for scholarly journals, including Michael Loewe, Beatrice Bartlett, Edwin Pulleyblank, and Hans Bielenstein. Reviewers universally praised the scope of the dictionary and the ambition of Hucker's project. Period specialists noted how helpful the book was at outlining the bureaucratic developments across history, but stated it contained inaccuracies regarding their own period of expertise. Experts on the Han dynasty and Qing dynasty were the most critical, since published works about the government structure and definitions with translations of the government offices of the time were already available and more complete. However, even the most critical reviewer, Hans Bielenstein, who had published just such a work about the Han dynasty government and translation of Han dynasty titles five years previous, stated that the dictionary would be an invaluable resource for researches for many years to come.

=== Retirement and death ===
At the time of his retirement from the University of Michigan in 1983, Hucker was regarded as one of the foremost historians of imperial China. In his honor, the university established the Charles O. Hucker professorship of Buddhist Studies in the Department of Asian Languages and Cultures, with Luis O. Gómez appointed as the first such named professor in 1986.

In retirement, Hucker and his wife Myrl lived in Tucson, Arizona, where did volunteer work in schools and hospitals. Hucker also wrote plays and short stories, several of which have been published or produced. Hucker died on November 14, 1994, in Odessa, Texas, at the age of 75. To pay tribute to his academic legacy, the University of Michigan Department of Asian Studies instituted a cash prize, the Charles and Myrl Hucker Undergraduate Essay Prize, to be awarded annually to a student in the department.

== Selected bibliography ==
- The Traditional Chinese State in Ming Times, 1368–1644. (1961). Tucson: University of Arizona Press. ISBN 9781014054210
- The Censorial System of Ming China. (1966). Stanford: Stanford University Press. ISBN 9780804702898
- China's Imperial Past: An Introduction to Chinese History. (1975). Stanford: Stanford University Press. ISBN 9780804723534
- The Ming Dynasty: Its Origins and Evolving Institutions. (1978). Ann Arbor: University of Michigan Center for Chinese Studies. ISBN 9780892640348
- China to 1850: A Short History. (1978). Stanford: Stanford University Press. ISBN 9780804709583
- A Dictionary of Official Titles in Imperial China. (1985). Stanford: Stanford University Press. ISBN 9789576382857
