= Luis O. Gómez =

Puerto Rican buddhologist, translator, and psychologist (1943–2017)

- Luis Óscar Gómez Rodríguez
- Born: April 7, 1943; Guayanilla, Puerto Rico
- Died: September 3, 2017 (aged 74); México City, Mexico
- Education: University of Puerto Rico (BA); Yale University (Ph.D.); University of Michigan (Ph.D.)
- Occupations: Buddhologist, translator and psychologist

Luis O. Gómez (7 April 1943 – 3 September 2017) was a buddhologist, translator and psychologist. He spent over three decades at the University of Michigan, working in the Department of Asian Languages and Cultures, Religious Studies Program, and the Department of Psychology. In 2007, he moved to Mexico City, where he joined the Center for Asian and African Studies at El Colegio de México as a researcher. He was born in Guayanilla, Puerto Rico.

Gómez received his B.A. degree in 1963 from University of Puerto Rico, enrolling there at age sixteen, earned his Ph.D. in Buddhist Studies, Indic Philology, and Japanese Language and Literature from Yale University in 1967. He went on to found the Ph.D. program in Buddhist Studies at the University of Michigan, and was appointed the Charles O. Hucker Professor of Buddhist Studies in 1986. He went on to receive the John H. D'Arms Award for Distinguished Graduate Mentoring in the Humanities in 1995. In 1997, he became the Arthur F. Thurnau Professor of Asian Languages and Cultures.

In 1998, Gómez earned his second Ph.D. in Clinical Psychology from the University of Michigan after thirty years since his first.

== Works ==
- La traducción en la didáctica de las lenguas clásicas de Asia: reflexiones preliminares. El Colegio de México – Gómez, Luis O. & García, Roberto E. (2019).
- Oriental wisdom and the cure of souls: Jung and the Indian East. Curators of the Buddha. –Gómez, Luis O. (1995).
- Land of bliss: The paradise of the buddha of measureless light: Sanskrit and chinese versions of the Sukhāvatīvyūha sutras. University of Hawaii Press. – Gómez, Luis O. (1996).
- El budismo como religión de esperanza. observaciones sobre la "lógica" de una doctrina y su mito fundacional. Estudios De Asia y Africa, 37(3 (119)), pp. 477–501. – Gómez, Luis O. (2002).
- Barabudur, history and significance of a buddhist monument. University of California.- Gómez, Luis O., & Woodward, Hiram W (1981).
