= K. R. Norman =

British philologist (1925–2020)

K. R. Norman FBA
- Born: Kenneth Roy Norman; 21 July 1925
- Died: 5 November 2020 (aged 95)
- Spouse: Pamela Raymont (m. 1953)
- Children: 2

Academic background
- Education: Taunton School, Somerset; Downing College, Cambridge

Academic work
- Discipline: Philologist
- Institutions: University of Cambridge (1952–1992)
- Main interests: Pali and other Middle Indo-Aryan languages

Kenneth Roy Norman FBA (21 July 1925 – 5 November 2020) was a British philologist at the University of Cambridge and a leading authority on Pali and other Middle Indo-Aryan languages.

== Life ==
Norman was born on 21 July 1925, and was educated at Taunton School in Somerset and Downing College, Cambridge, receiving his M.A. in 1954.

I was trained as a classicist and studied classical philology, in the form which was current in my student days, i.e. the investigation of the relationship between Latin, Greek and Sanskrit in particular, and between other Indo-European languages in general. I went on to study Sanskrit and the dialects associated with Sanskrit—the Prakrits—and was appointed to teach the Prakrits, or Middle Indo-Aryan, as they are sometimes called, lying as they do between Old Indo-Aryan, i.e. Sanskrit, and New Indo-Aryan, i.e. the modern Indo-Aryan languages spoken mainly in North India.

— K. R. Norman, A Philological Approach to Buddhism

The whole of his academic career was spent at Cambridge. He was appointed Lecturer in Indian Studies in 1955, Reader in 1978, and Professor of Indian Studies in 1990. He retired in 1992.

From 1981 to 1994 he was President of the Pali Text Society, and from January to March 1994 he was the Bukkyō Dendō Kyōkai Visiting Professor at the School of Oriental and African Studies.

He was made a Foreign Member of the Royal Danish Academy of Sciences and Letters in 1983 and a Fellow of the British Academy in 1985.

He died on 5 November 2020, at the age of ninety-five.

== Notable works ==
=== Translations ===
- Elders' Verses: Vol. I (1969, 2nd ed. 2007), a translation of the Theragāthā
- Elders' Verses: Vol. II (1971, 2nd ed. 2007), a translation of the Therīgāthā
- The Word of the Doctrine (1991), a translation of the Dhammapada
- The Group of Discourses (1992, 2nd ed. 2001), a translation of the Suttanipāta (Note: Published in paperback as The Rhinoceros Horn and Other Early Buddhist Poems.)
- Pātimokkha (2001), a translation of the Pātimokkha
- Overcoming Doubts: Vol. I: The Bhikkhu-Pātimokkha Commentary (with P. Kieffer-Pülz and W. Pruitt, 2018), a translation of the Kaṅkhāvitaraṇī

=== Other books ===
- Pali Literature (1983)
- A Philological Approach to Buddhism: The Bukkyō Dendō Kyōkai Lectures 1994 (1997)
- Collected Papers: Vols. I–VIII (1990–2007)

=== Papers ===
- Samprasāraṇa in Middle Indo-Aryan (1958)
- Notes on Aśoka's Fifth Pillar Edict (1967)
- Dr. Bimala Churn Law (1969)
- Some Aspects of the Phonology of the Prakrit Underlying the Aśokan Inscriptions (1970)
- Notes on the Bahapur Version of Aśoka's Minor Rock Edict (1971)
- Notes on the Greek Version of Aśoka's Twelfth and Thirteenth Rock Edicts (1972)
- Aśoka and Capital Punishment: Notes on a Portion of Aśoka's Fourth Pillar Edict, with an Appendix on the Accusative Absolute Construction (1975)
- Two Pali Etymologies (1979)
- A Note on Attā in the Alagaddūpama-sutta (1981)
- The Nine Treasures of the Cakravartin (1983)
- The Pāli Language and the Theravādin Tradition (1983)
- The Pratyeka-Buddha in Buddhism and Jainism (1983)
- The Origin of Pāli and Its Position among the Indo-European Languages (1988)
- Aspects of Early Buddhism (1990)
- Pāli Philology and the Study of Buddhism (1990)
- Studies in the Minor Rock Edicts of Aśoka (1991)
- On Translating from Pāli (1992)
- Theravāda Buddhism and Brahmanical Hinduism: Brahmanical Terms in a Buddhist Guise (1992)
- ‘ Solitary as Rhinoceros Horn ’ (1996)
- The Four Noble Truths (2003)
- Why are the Four Noble Truths Called “Noble”? (2008)
