= Gandhāran Buddhist texts =

Ancient Gandhāran Buddhist manuscript

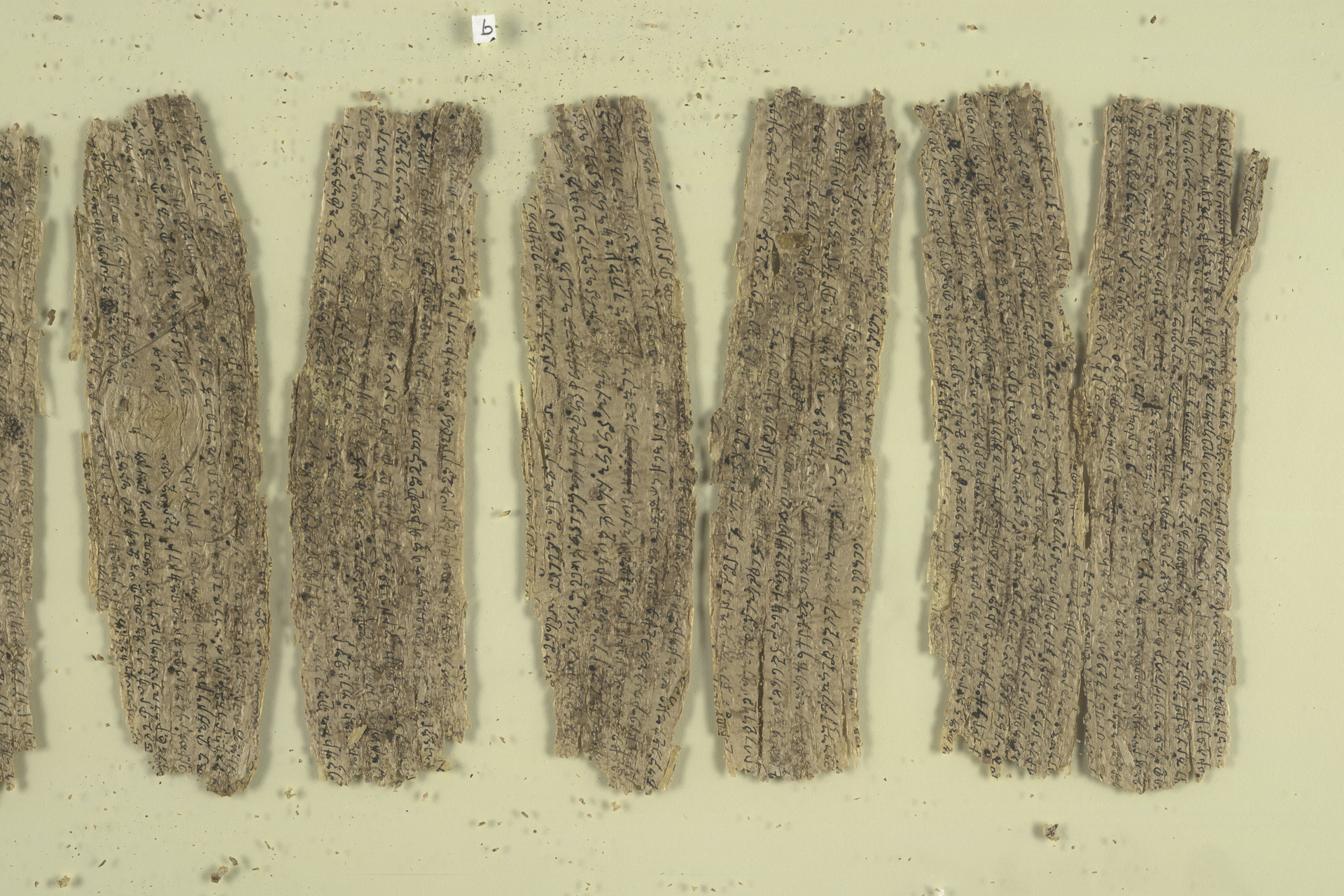
Gandhara birchbark scroll fragments (c. 1st century) from the British Library Collection

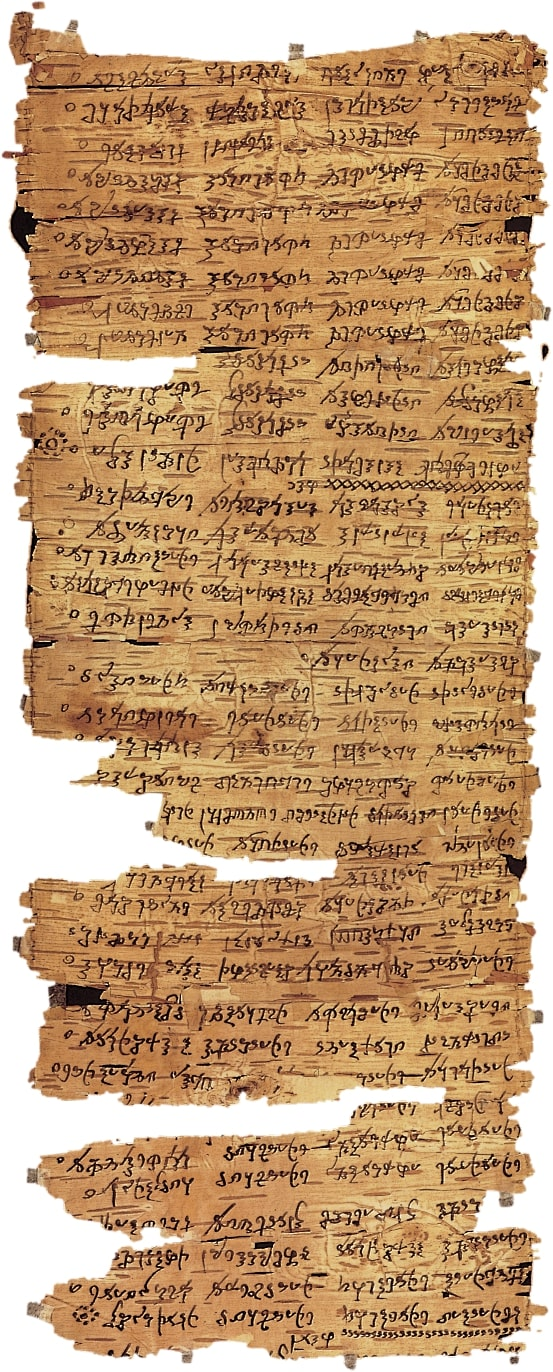
Incomplete birchbark manuscript of the Dhammapada in Gandhari language acquired by the Dutreuil de Rhins mission (1891–1894) in Central Asia. End of the 1st century to 3rd century. Bibliothèque nationale de France

The Gandhāran Buddhist texts are the oldest Buddhist manuscripts yet discovered, dating from about the 1st century BCE to 3rd century CE. They represent the literature of Gandharan Buddhism and are written in the Gandhārī language, Middle Indo-Aryan Prakrit. The texts constitute the largest collection of Gandhārī manuscripts known to date.

Many of manuscripts are now housed at the Islamabad Museum in Pakistan. Some were sold to European and Japanese institutions and individuals, and are currently being recovered and studied by several universities. The Gandhāran texts are in a considerably deteriorated form, their survival alone being extraordinary, but educated guesses about reconstruction have been possible in several cases using both modern preservation techniques and more traditional textual scholarship, comparing previously known Pāli and Buddhist Hybrid Sanskrit versions of texts. Other Gandhāran Buddhist texts — "several and perhaps many" — have been found over the last two centuries but lost or destroyed.

The texts are attributed to the Dharmaguptaka sect by Richard Salomon, a leading scholar in the field, and the British Library scrolls "represent a random but reasonably representative fraction of what was probably a much larger set of texts preserved in the library of a monastery of the Dharmaguptaka sect in Nagarāhāra."

== Collections ==
=== The British Library Collection ===
In 1994, the British Library acquired a group of some eighty Gandharan manuscript fragments from the first half of the 1st century CE, encompassing twenty‐seven birch‐bark scrolls. These birch bark manuscripts were stored in clay jars, which preserved them. They are thought to have been found in western Pakistan, the location of Gandhara, buried beneath ancient monasteries. A team has been at work, trying to decipher the manuscripts: several volumes have appeared to date (see below). The manuscripts were written in the Gandhārī language using the Kharoṣṭhī script and are therefore sometimes also called the Kharoṣṭhī Manuscripts.

The collection is composed of a diversity of texts: a Dhammapada, discourses of the Buddha such as the Rhinoceros Sutra, Avadanas and Purvayogas, commentaries and Abhidharma texts.

There is evidence to suggest that these texts may belong to the Dharmaguptaka school. There is an inscription on a jar pointing to that school, and there is some textual evidence as well. On a semi-related point, the Gandhāran text of the Rhinoceros Sutra contains the word mahayaṇaṣa, which some might identify with "Mahayana." However, according to Salomon, in Kharoṣṭhī orthography there is no reason to think that the phrase in question, amaṃtraṇa bhoti mahayaṇaṣa ("there are calls from the multitude"), has any connection to the Mahayana.

=== The Senior Collection ===
The Senior collection was bought by Robert Senior, a British collector. The Senior collection may be slightly younger than the British Library collection. It consists almost entirely of canonical sutras, and, like the British Library collection, was written on birch bark and stored in clay jars. The jars bear inscriptions referring to Macedonian rather than ancient Indian month names, as is characteristic of the Kaniska era from which they derive. There is a "strong likelihood that the Senior scrolls were written, at the earliest, in the latter part of the first century A.D., or, perhaps more likely, in the first half of the second century. This would make the Senior scrolls slightly but significantly later than the scrolls of the British Library collection, which have been provisionally dated to the first half of the first century." Salomon writes:

The Senior collection is superficially similar in character to the British Library collection in that they both consist of about two dozen birch bark manuscripts or manuscript fragments arranged in scroll or similar format and written in Kharosthi script and Gandhari language. Both were found inside inscribed clay pots, and both are believed to have come from the same or nearby sites, in or around Hadda in eastern Afghanistan. But in terms of their textual contents, the two collections differ in important ways. Whereas the British Library collection was a diverse mixture of texts of many different genres written by some two dozen different scribes, all or nearly all of the manuscripts in the Senior collection are written in the same hand, and all but one of them seem to belong to the same genre, namely sutra. Moreover, whereas all of the British Library scrolls were fragmentary and at least some of them were evidently already damaged and incomplete before they were interred in antiquity,} some of the Senior scrolls are still more or less complete and intact and must have been in good condition when they were buried. Thus the Senior scrolls, unlike the British Library scrolls, constitute a unified, cohesive, and at least partially intact collection that was carefully interred as such.

He further reports that the "largest number of parallels for the sutras in the Senior collection are in the Saṃyutta Nikāya and the corresponding collections in Sanskrit and Chinese."

=== The Schøyen collection ===
The Buddhist works within the Schøyen collection consist of birch bark, palm leaf and vellum manuscripts. They are thought to have been found in the Bamiyan caves of Afghanistan, where refugees were seeking shelter. Most of these manuscripts were bought by a Norwegian collector, named Martin Schøyen, while smaller quantities are in possession of Japanese collectors. These manuscripts date from the second to the 8th century CE. In addition to texts in Gandhāri, the Schøyen collection also contains important early sutric material in Sanskrit.

The Buddhist texts within the Schøyen collection include fragments of canonical Suttas, Abhidharma, Vinaya, and Mahāyāna texts. Most of these manuscripts are written in the Brahmi scripts, while a small portion is written in Gandhāri/Kharoṣṭhī script.

Among the early Dharmaguptaka texts in the Schøyen Collection is a fragment in the Kharoṣṭhī script referencing the Six Pāramitās, a central practice for bodhisattvas in Mahāyāna Buddhism.

=== University of Washington ===
One more manuscript, written on birch bark in a Buddhist monastery of the Abhidharma tradition, from the 1st or 2nd century CE, was acquired from a collector by the University of Washington Libraries in 2002. It is an early commentary on the Buddha's teachings, on the subject of human suffering.

=== Library of Congress ===
In 2003, the Library of Congress purchased a scroll from a British antiquities dealer. Called the "Bahubuddha Sutra", or "The Many Buddhas Sutra", the scroll arrived in pieces in a pen case but retains 80% of the text with the beginning and ending missing due to age. The content is similar to the "Mahāvastu." They mostly contain educational content.The text is narrated by Gautama Buddha and "tells the story of the 13 Buddhas who preceded him, his own emergence and the prediction of a future Buddha."

=== The Khotan Dharmapada ===
In 1892 a copy of the Dhammapada written in the Gandhārī Prakrit was discovered near Khotan in Xinjiang, western China. It was broken up and came to Europe in parts, some going to Russia and some to France, but unfortunately a portion of the manuscript never appeared on the market and seems to have been lost. In 1898 most of the French material was published in the Journal Asiatique. In 1962 John Brough published the collected Russian and French fragments with a commentary.

=== The "Split" Collection ===
About the "Split" collection, Harry Falk writes:

The local origins of the present collection are not clear. Several part[s] of it were seen in Peshawar in 2004. According to usually reliable informants the collection of birch-barks was found in a stone case in the Pakistan-Afghanistan border area, comprising the Mohmand Agency and Bajaur. It was split on arrival and some parts are now in a Western collection, while others went to a Government agency and yet other parts may still be with the private owner.

The earliest manuscript from Split collection is the one that contains a series of Avadana tales, mentioning a king and Ajivikas, and Buddhist sects like Dharmaguptakas, Mahasamghikas and Seriyaputras, as well as persons like Upatisya and the thief Aṅgulimāla who gets advice from his wife in Pataliputra. This manuscript is currently held in three glass frames covering around 300 fragments, and the style of handwriting has affinities to Ashokan period. A small fragment was subjected to radiocarbon analysis at the Leibnitz Labor in Kiel, Germany, in 2007, the result was that it is from sometime between 184 BCE and 46 BCE (95.4% probability, two sigma range), and the youngest peak is around 70 BCE, so this reconsideration puts this manuscript, that Harry Falk calls "An Avadana collection", into the first century BCE.

In 2012, Harry Falk and Seishi Karashima published a damaged and partial Kharoṣṭhī manuscript of the Mahāyāna Aṣṭasāhasrikā Prajñāpāramitā Sūtra. It is carbon dated to ca. 75 CE (with a two-sigma range of 47-147 CE), making it one of the oldest Buddhist texts in existence. It is very similar to the first Chinese translation of the Aṣṭasāhasrikā by Lokakṣema (ca. 179 CE) whose source text is assumed to be in the Gāndhārī language. Comparison with the standard Sanskrit text shows that it too is likely a translation from Gāndhāri as it expands on many phrases and provides glosses for words that are not present in the Gāndhārī. This points to the text being composed in Gāndhārī, the language of Gandhāra (in what is now the Khyber Pakhtunkhwa province of Pakistan, including Peshawar, Taxila and the Swat Valley). The "Split" ms. is evidently a copy of an earlier text, confirming that the text may date before the first century of the common era.

=== The Bajaur Collection ===
The Bajaur Collection was discovered in 1999, and is believed to be from the ruins of a Buddhist monastery in the Dir region of Pakistan. The name derives from the Bajaur district, whose boundary with the Dir district is marked by the banks of the river where the monastery was situated.

The collection comprises fragments of 19 birch-bark scrolls and contains approximately 22 different texts. Most of the texts are not the work of the same scribe, with as many as 18 different hands identified. The fragments range from small sections only a few centimeters in length to a nearly complete scroll nearly 2m long. It is dated to the 1st-2nd Century CE, and written using the Kharosthi script. The fragments were fixed in frames and used to produce high-quality digital images at the University of Peshawar, with collaboration with the Freie University of Berlin.

Notable texts from the collection include the earliest identified Vinaya text, in the form of a Pratimoksa sutra, and a relatively complete Mahayana text connected with the Buddha Aksobhya showing a well-developed movement in the vein of Pure Land Buddhism. While the majority of the texts in the collection are Buddhist texts, two non-Buddhist works are included in the form of a loan contract and an Arthasastra/Rajnitit text, one of the few known Sanskrit texts composed using the Kharosthi script.

== Published material ==
Scholarly critical editions of the texts of the University of Washington and the British Library are being printed by the University of Washington Press in the "Gandhāran Buddhist Texts" series, beginning with a detailed analysis of the Gāndhārī Rhinoceros Sutra including phonology, morphology, orthography, paleography, etc. Material from the Schøyen Collection is published by Hermes Publishing, Oslo, Norway.

The following scholars have published fragments of the Gandhāran manuscripts: Raymond Allchin, Mark Allon, Mark Barnard, Stefan Baums, John Brough, Harry Falk, Andrew Glass, Mei‐huang Lee, Timothy Lenz, Sergey Oldenburg, Richard Salomon and Émile Senart. Some of the published material is listed below:

=== General overviews ===
- Ancient Buddhist Scrolls from Gandhāra (1999) by Richard Salomon, with Raymond Allchin and Mark Barnard. An early description of the finds.
- The Buddhist Literature of Ancient Gandhāra: An Introduction with Selected Translations (2018) by Richard Salomon. A modern update.

=== Editions of specific texts ===
- A Gandhari Version of the Rhinoceros Sutra (2000) by Richard Salomon and Andrew Glass
- Three Gandhari Ekottarikagama-Type Sutras (2001) by Mark Allon and Andrew Glass
- A New Version of the Gandhari Dharmapada and a Collection of Previous-Birth Stories (2003) by Timothy Lenz, Andrew Glass, and Bhikshu Dharmamitra
- Four Gandhari Samyuktagama Sutras (2007) by Andrew Glass and Mark Allon
- Two Gandhari Manuscripts of the "Songs of Lake Anavatapta" (2008) by Richard Salomon and Andrew Glass
- Gandharan Avadanas (2010) by Timothy Lenz

=== Other publications ===
- Manuscripts in the Schøyen Collection: Buddhist Manuscripts, Vol. 1. (2000) by Jens Braarvig (editor). Oslo: Hermes Publishing.
- 'Buddhist Kharoshthi Manuscripts from Gandhara" by M. Nasim Khan. Journal of Humanities and Social Sciences. Vol. XII, Nos. 1 & 2 (2004): 9–15. Peshawar.
- Kharoshthi Manuscripts from Gandhara (2009) by M. Nasim Khan. Peshawar.
- "The ‘Split’ Collection of Kharoṣṭhī Text" (2011) by Harry Falk (Berlin) Annual Report of the International Research Institute for Advanced Buddhology XIV (2011), 13–23. Online
- "A first‐century Prajñāpāramitā manuscript from Gandhāra - parivarta 1 (Texts from the Split Collection 1)" (2012) by Harry Falk and Seishi Karashima. Annual Report of the International Research Institute for Advanced Buddhology XV (2012), 19–61. Online

== Analysis of the manuscripts' contents ==
First studies of these Gandharan manuscripts in 1990’s seemed to show that Sūtra texts were prominent in these collections, but subsequent research showed that such a situation was not evident. Now researchers, like Richard Salomon, consider that Buddhist discourses (sūtras) are actually a small portion of the whole Gandharan texts, especially in the oldest period. These early sūtras tend to be only a few common and popular texts, mostly belonging to Kṣudraka/Khuddaka type of material. Richard Salomon, quoting Anne Blackburn, considers them to be part of a limited “practical canon” used in Gandharan monasteries, he concludes that by comparing them to Sanskrit manuscripts from Xinjiang and katikāvatas instructions from Sri Lankan material.

== See also ==
- Gilgit manuscripts
- Early Buddhist schools
- Early Buddhist Texts
- Greco-Buddhism
- Buddhism in Afghanistan
- Buddhism in Pakistan
- Pali Canon
- Schools of Buddhism
- Palm-leaf manuscript

== Sources ==
- Fumio, Enomoto (2000), "The Discovery of 'the Oldest Buddhist Manuscripts", The Eastern Buddhist, 32 (1): 157–166, JSTOR 44362247
- Baums, Stefan (2014), "Gandhāran Scrolls: Rediscovering an Ancient Manuscript Type", in Quenzer, Jörg; Bondarev, Dmitry; Sobisch, Jan-Ulrich (eds.), Manuscript Cultures: Mapping the Field (PDF), Walter de Gruyter GmbH & Co KG, ISBN 9783110225631
- Melzer, Gudrun (2014), "A Paleographic Study of a Buddhist Manuscript from the Gilgit Region", in Quenzer, Jörg; Bondarev, Dmitry; Sobisch, Jan-Ulrich (eds.), Manuscript Cultures: Mapping the Field, Walter de Gruyter GmbH & Co KG, ISBN 9783110225631
- Olivelle, Patrick (2006), Between the Empires: Society in India 300 BCE to 400 CE, Oxford University Press, ISBN 0-19-530532-9
- Salomon, Richard (1999), Ancient Buddhist Scrolls from Gandhāra: The British Library Kharosthī Fragments, University of Washington Press, ISBN 978-0295977690
- Salomon, Richard; Glass, Andrew (2000). A Gāndhārī Version of the Rhinoceros Sūtra: British Library Kharoṣṭhī Fragment 5B. University of Washington Press. ISBN 978-0-295-98035-5.
- Salomon, Richard (2003), "The Senior Manuscripts: Another Collection of Gandhāran Buddhist Scrolls" (PDF), Journal of the American Oriental Society, 123 (1): 73–92, doi:10.2307/3217845, JSTOR 3217845, archived from the original (PDF) on May 23, 2020
- Allon, Mark (2004), "Wrestling with Kharosthi Manuscripts", BDK Fellowship Newsletter, 7
- Salomon, Richard (2018), The Buddhist Literature of Ancient Gandhāra: An Introduction with Selected Translations, Wisdom Publications, ISBN 978-1-61429-168-8
