= Richard G. Salomon (professor of Asian studies) =

American Indian history professor (born 1948)

- Occupation: Professor
- Title: William P. and Ruth Gerberding University Professor

Academic background
- Education: Columbia University (B.A.); University of Pennsylvania (Ph.D.)

Academic work
- Institutions: University of Washington
- Main interests: Indian Buddhism studies

Richard G. Salomon is the William P. and Ruth Gerberding University Professor emeritus in the Department of Asian Languages and Literature at the University of Washington. Salomon is a Sanskrit, Pali and Prakrit-languages scholar, known for his studies on Indian epigraphy. He is also a specialist in early Indian Buddhism studies.

== Education ==
Salomon received his Ph.D. in Sanskrit (with Distinction) from the University of Pennsylvania in 1975 and a B.A. in Oriental Studies (minor in Religion) from Columbia University in 1970.

== Honors and awards ==
In 2016, the Puget Sound Association of Phi Beta Kappa honored him with its Humanities Achievement Award "in recognition of his study of the Gandharan manuscripts, which illuminate the oldest period of Buddhist culture for which documents exist, and the dissemination of its results."

== Publications ==
Salomon's main publications are:

=== Books ===
- Salomon, Richard (1998), Indian Epigraphy: A Guide to the Study of Inscriptions in Sanskrit, Prakrit, and the Other Indo-Aryan Languages, Oxford University Press, ISBN 978-0-19-509984-3
- The Buddhist Literature of Ancient Gandhara: An Introduction with Selected Translations, Wisdom Publications, 2018, ISBN 978-1614291688

=== Articles and chapters ===
- "The Senior Manuscripts: Another Collection of Gandhāran Buddhist Scrolls." Journal of the American Oriental Society 123,1 (2003) 73–92.
- (with Mark Allon) "Kharoṣṭhī fragments of a Gāndhārī version of the Mahāparinirvāṇasūtra." In: Braarvig 2000*, p. 243–273.
- "A Fragment of a Collection of Buddhist Legends, with a Reference to King Huviṣka as a Follower of the Mahāyāna." In: Braarvig 2002*, p. 255–267.
- "A Jar with a Kharoṣṭhī Inscription." In: Braarvig 2002*, p. 351–355.
- (with Mark Allon et al.) "Radiocarbon Dating of Kharoṣṭhī Fragments from the Schoyen and Senior Manuscript Collections." In: Braarvig 2006*, p. 279–291.
- (with Gregory Schopen) "On an Alleged Reference to Amitābha in a Kharoṣṭhī Inscription on a Gandhārian Relief." Journal of the International Association of Buddhist Studies 25,1-2 (2002) 3–31.
- "Why did the Gandhāran Buddhists bury their manuscripts?" In: Buddhist Manuscript Cultures (Knowledge, ritual, and art), ed. S. C. Berkwitz, J. Schober, C. Brown, 2009, Routledge, p. 19–34.
- "Aśvaghoṣa's Saundarananda IV-VI: A Study in the Poetic Structure of Buddhist Kāvya." Indo-Iranian Journal 52,2-3 (2009) 179–196.
- (with Mark Allon) "New Evidence for Mahayana in Early Gandhāra." The Eastern Buddhist 41,1 (2010) 1–22.
- (with Mark Allon) "Kharoṣṭhī fragments of a Gāndhārī version of the Mahāparinirvāṇasūtra." In: Braarvig 2000*, p. 243–273.
- "An Unwieldy Canon: Observations on Some Distinctive Features of Canon Formation in Buddhism." In: Deeg/ Freiberger/ Kleine 2011*, p. 161–207.
- "Aṣṭabhujasvāmin: A Reinterpretation of the Ābhīra Inscription from Nagarjunakonda." Indo-Iranian Journal 56,3-4 (2013) 397–417.
- "Gāndhārī Manuscripts in the British Library, Schoyen and Other Collections." In: Harrison/ Hartmann 2014*, p. 1–17.
- (with Joseph Marino) "Observations on the Deorkothar Inscriptions and their Significance for the Evaluation of Buddhist Historical Traditions." Annual Report of The International Institute for Advanced Buddhology at Soka University 17 (2013 [2014]) 27–39.
- "New Manuscript Sources for the Study of Gandhāran Buddhism." In: Gandharan Buddhism: Archaeology, Art, and Texts (2006) 135–147.
- "Aśvaghoṣa in Central Asia: Some Comments on the Recensional History of His Works in Light of Recent Manuscript Discoveries." In: Buddhism across boundaries—Chinese Buddhism and the Western Regions (1999) 219–263.

=== Reviews ===
- Book Review of Bechert 1995 (Sanskrithandschriften aus den Turfanfunden, part 7). Journal of the American Oriental Society 118 (1998) 121–124.
- Review of Oguibénine 1996 (Initiation pratique à l'étude du Sanskrit bouddhique). Journal of the American Oriental Society 120 (2000) 463–464.
- Review of Wille 2000 (Sanskrithandschriften aus den Turfanfunden, vol. 8: Die Katalognummern 1800–1999). Journal of the American Oriental Society 123,1 (2003) 224–226.
- Review of Willis 2000 (Buddhist Reliquaries from Ancient India). Journal of the American Oriental Society 124,1 (2004) 199–201.
- Book Review of John S. Strong 2004 (Relics of the Buddha). Journal of the International Association of Buddhist Studies 28,2 (2005) 469–472.
- Book Review of Karashima - Wille 2006 (Buddhist Manuscripts from Central Asia: The British Library Sanskrit Fragments. Vol. 1). Journal of the American Oriental Society 128,4 (2008) 809.
- Book Review of Dimitrov 2010 (The Bhaikṣukī Manuscript of the Candrālaṃkāra: Study, Script Tables, and Facsimile Edition [Harvard Oriental Series 72]). Indo-Iranian Journal 55,1 (2012) 39–49.
- (with Stefan Baums and Cristina A. Scherrer-Schaub) "Buddhist Inscriptions from Termez (Uzbekistan): A New Comprehensive Edition and Study" (= Book Review of Fussman et al. 2011 [Catalogue des inscriptions sur poteries]). Indo-Iranian Journal 55,2 (2012) 139–170.
- Book Review of Wille 2008 (Sanskrithandschriften aus den Turfanfunden, pt. 10: Die Katalognummern 3200–4362). Journal of the American Oriental Society 132,3 (2012) 506–508.
- Book Review of Coville 2009 (A Metaphorical Study of Saundarananda). Indo-Iranian Journal 56,1 (2013) 93–98.
