= Sutta Piṭaka =

Division of the Pali Canon of Theravada Buddhism

- SuttaCentral; OpenTipitaka
- Type: Canonical collection
- Parent: Tipiṭaka
- Contains: Dīgha Nikāya; Majjhima Nikāya; Saṃyutta Nikāya; Aṅguttara Nikāya; Khuddaka Nikāya
- Aṭṭhakathā: Sumaṅgalavilāsinī; Papañcasūdanī; Sāratthappakāsinī; Manorathapūraṇī; Khuddakanikāya-aṭṭhakathā
- Ṭīkā: Dīghanikāya-ṭīkā; Majjhimanikāya-ṭīkā; Saṃyuttanikāya-ṭīkā; Aṅguttaranikāya-ṭīkā; Khuddakanikāya-ṭīkā (Netippakaraṇa-ṭīkā, Nettivibhāvinī)
- Related: Visuddhimagga
- Abbreviation: Sutta

The Sutta Piṭaka (also referred to as Sūtra Piṭaka or Suttanta Piṭaka; English: Basket of Discourse) is the second of the three divisions of the Pali Tripitaka, the definitive canonical collection of scripture of Theravada Buddhism. The other two parts of the Tripiṭaka are the Vinaya Piṭaka (Basket of Discipline) and the Abhidhamma Piṭaka (Basket of Higher Doctrine). The Sutta Pitaka contains more than 10,000 suttas (teachings) attributed to the Buddha or his close companions.

== Origins ==
According to tradition, what was later to become the written scripture of the Sutta Pitaka was first orally rehearsed by Buddha’s cousin Ānanda at the First Buddhist Council that was held shortly after the Buddha's death. The first Council also defined the set of rules (Vinaya) that governed the life of monks and nuns within the monastic community. Tradition holds that little was added to the Canon after this. Scholars are more skeptical, but differ in their degrees of skepticism. Richard Gombrich thinks most of the first four nikayas (see below) go back to the Buddha, in content but not in form. The late Professor Hirakawa Akira says that the First Council collected only short prose passages or verses expressing important doctrines, and that these were expanded into full length suttas over the next century.

== Contents ==
There are five nikayas (collections) of suttas:

1. Digha Nikāya (dīghanikāya), the "long" discourses.
2. Majjhima Nikāya, the "middle-length" discourses.
3. Saṁyutta Nikāya (saṃyutta-), the "connected" discourses.
4. Anguttara Nikāya (aṅguttara-), the "numerical" discourses.
5. Khuddaka Nikāya, the "minor collection".

=== Digha Nikāya ===
This includes The Greater Discourse on the Foundations of Mindfulness, The Fruits of the Contemplative Life, and The Buddha's Last Days. There are 34 long suttas in this nikaya.

=== Majjhima Nikāya ===
This includes Shorter Exposition of Kamma, Mindfulness of Breathing, and Mindfulness of the Body. There are 152 medium-length suttas in this nikaya.

=== Samyutta Nikaya ===
There are, according to one reckoning, 2,889, but according to the commentary 7,762, shorter suttas in this Nikaya.

=== Anguttara Nikāya ===
These teachings are arranged numerically. It includes, according to the commentary's reckoning, 9,565 short suttas grouped by number from ones to elevens. According to Keown, "there is considerable disparity between the Pāli and the Sarvāstivādin versions, with more than two-thirds of the sūtras found in one but not the other compilation, which suggests that much of this portion of the Sūtra Piṭaka was not formed until a fairly late date."

=== Khuddaka Nikāya ===
This is a heterogeneous mix of sermons, doctrines, and poetry attributed to the Buddha and his disciples. The contents vary somewhat between editions. The Thai edition includes 1-15 below, the Sinhalese edition 1-17 and the Burmese edition 1-18.

1. Khuddakapatha
2. Dhammapada
3. Udana
4. Itivuttaka
5. Suttanipata
6. Vimanavatthu
7. Petavatthu
8. Theragatha
9. Therigatha
10. Jataka
11. Niddesa
12. Patisambhidamagga
13. Apadana
14. Buddhavamsa
15. Cariyapitaka
16. Nettipakarana or Netti
17. Petakopadesa
18. Milinda Panha

For more on these editions also see Pali Canon

== Translations ==
- The first four nikayas and more than half of the fifth have been translated by the Pali Text Society.
- The first four have also been translated in the Teachings of the Buddha series by Wisdom Publications.
- The first four nikayas, as well as six books from the Khuddaka Nikāya, have been translated from the Pali by Ṭhānissaro Bhikkhu and released under a Creative Commons license, and are available at dhammatalks.org

Selections (including material from at least two nikayas):

- Buddhist Suttas, ed & tr T. W. Rhys Davids, Sacred Books of the East, volume XI, Clarendon/Oxford, 1881; reprinted by Motilal Banarsidass, Delhi (& ?Dover, New York)
- The Word of the Buddha, ed & tr Nyanatiloka, 1935
- Early Buddhist Poetry, ed I. B. Horner, Ananda Semage, Colombo, 1963
- The Book of Protection, tr Piyadassi, Buddhist Publication Society, Kandy, Sri Lanka, 1981; translation of the paritta
- In the Buddha's Words, ed & tr Bodhi, Wisdom Pubns, 2005
- Early Buddhist Discourses, ed & tr John J. Holder, 2006
- Sayings of the Buddha, ed & tr Rupert Gethin, Oxford University Press, 2008
- Basic Teachings of the Buddha, ed & tr Glenn Wallis, New York: Random House, 2007

== See also ==
- Abhidhamma Pitaka
- Access to Insight
- Āgama
- Buddhist Publication Society
- Dhamma Society Fund
- List of suttas
- Nikāya
- Pāli Canon
- Pali Text Society
- Pariyatti (bookstore)
- Vinaya Pitaka
