= Bhāṇaka =

People in Buddhist history

Bhāṇaka (Pali: reciter) were Buddhist monks who specialized in the memorization and recitation of a specific collection of texts within the Buddhist canon. Lineages of bhāṇakas were responsible for preserving and transmitting the teachings of the Buddha until the canon was committed to writing in the 1st century BC, and declined as the oral transmission of early Buddhism was replaced by writing.

== Early Buddhist era ==
Academic consensus and Buddhist tradition holds that all early Buddhist traditions preserved their texts via oral transmission – significant evidence of this includes the structure and distinctive features of early Buddhist texts, the absence of Vinaya regulations dealing with writing and writing materials, and terms derived from practices of listening and recitation used to describe the Buddha's teaching and the acts of the early Sangha.

The bhāṇaka system is believed to have originated in India, but the majority of the literary and inscriptional evidence relating to bhāṇakas comes from Sri Lanka. Scholars suspect that the same techniques were used by the monks of all early Buddhist schools to fix and transmit the contents of the Agamas, but outside of the Theravada tradition little information about the pre-literary period of these traditions is available. The earliest evidence for the association of monks known as bhāṇaka with knowledge and recitation of specific parts of the Buddhist canon dates to the 2nd or 3rd century BCE.

All schools of Buddhism agree that shortly after the death of the Buddha, a council of his senior students was held to clarify and record his teachings. At this gathering (known as the First Buddhist Council), Upali was questioned regarding the contents of the Vinaya and Ananda was similarly questioned regarding the Dhamma. Once the council had agreed on the contents of the teachings, they acknowledged their acceptance of the sutras by reciting them together.

Subsequent major and minor councils are depicted as following the same basic procedure to compare, correct, and fix the contents of the canon, with specialists in each area of the collection called upon to recite the complete text for confirmation by the gathered Sangha.

== Theravada tradition ==
Buddhaghosa reported that according to the oral tradition of the Mahavihara, each of the four Nikayas were entrusted to an individual elder of the early Sangha and their students for preservation. Ananda was given responsibility for the Digha Nikaya, Sariputta for the Majjhima Nikaya, Mahakassapa for the Samyutta Nikaya, and Anuruddha for the Anguttara Nikaya.

Scholars doubt that the sutras and four Nikayas were established in their final form this early, with K.R. Norman suggesting that this story may be a reflection of later practices. Some texts of the Theravada Abhidhamma Pitaka and Khuddaka Nikaya clearly originate after the First Council, but Theravadins have generally regarded portions of the Abhidhamma as being included at this stage as part of the dhamma/suttas. Texts known to have relatively late origins (after the Third Council) are included in the Theravada accounts of the First Council. Texts that did not fit into any of the four Nikayas were assigned to the Khuddaka (which included the Abhidhamma in some traditions).

In the Theravada commentaries, references are found to bhāṇakas that specialized in each of the four Nikayas, as well as Jataka-bhāṇakas, Dhammapada-bhāṇakas, and Khuddaka-bhāṇakas. Each group of bhāṇakas was responsible for reciting and teaching their texts, and seem to have exercised independent judgement as to how their texts were organized and the versions of stories and doctrines that they preserved – variant readings between versions of content preserved in both the Digha Nikaya and Majjhima Nikaya, for instance, may be attributable to the preservation of different versions by different schools of bhāṇakas. Different schools of bhāṇakas may have 'closed' their canon at different times, and seem to have differed in some cases in which texts of the Khuddaka Nikaya and Abhidharma Pitaka they accepted as canonical.

Stupa inscriptions from India dating to the 2nd century BCE mention bhāṇakas who specialized in teaching the sutras or knew the four Nikayas/Agamas but do not represent them as specializing in a single Nikaya. By contrast, cave inscriptions from Sri Lanka ranging in date from the 3rd century BCE to the 1st century CE make specific references to monks who specialized in the Samyutta Nikaya, Majjhima Nikaya, or Anguttara Nikaya. Roles as bhāṇaka of a particular Nikaya were passed down from teacher to student.

KR Norman suggests that the Theravada practice of organizing bhāṇakas by Nikaya may not have originated until after the Second Buddhist Council. The Dipavamsa mentions a 'nine-fold' organization of the early texts being divided into individual chapters at the First Council, which may reflect an earlier method of organization.

References to abhidhammikas (specialists in the Abhidhamma) but not to Abhidhamma-bhāṇakas in the Milindapanha may suggest that the bhāṇaka system originated before the Abhidhamma Pitaka was 'closed' by the Theravadins (dated by them to the era of Ashoka at the Third Buddhist Council) but, since the Abhidhamma may have been recited by some variety of sutta-bhāṇaka, could also indicate that being a specialist in a branch of texts was distinct from being responsible for its recitation.

== Decline ==
No fixed date has been established for the end of the bhāṇaka tradition, but scholars generally believe that the tradition went into decline as the Buddhist canon increasingly began to be preserved through written texts. Buddhaghosa wrote about the bhāṇakas as though they were contemporary in approximately the 5th century CE, but may have been reflecting the perspective of the earlier Sinhala commentaries – his remarks do not definitively establish that the bhāṇaka practice persisted into his own era.

The Culavamsa refers to a bhāṇaka as late as the 13th century CE, but by this date the term may have become generic for a preacher or specialist in recitation, rather than a monk who preserved a significant portion of the canon by memory.

== See also ==
- Oral tradition
