= Khuddaka Nikāya =

5th Buddhist Scriptures Collection in Pāli Canon

- SuttaCentral; OpenTipitaka
- Type: Canonical collection
- Parent: Sutta Piṭaka
- Contains: Khuddakapāṭha; Dhammapada; Udāna; Itivuttaka; Sutta Nipāta; Vimānavatthu; Petavatthu; Theragāthā; Therīgāthā; Apadāna; Buddhavaṁsa; Cariyāpiṭaka; Jātaka; Niddesa; Paṭisambhidāmagga; Nettipakaraṇa; Peṭakopadesa; Milindapañha
- Aṭṭhakathā: Paramatthajotikā (Khuddakapāṭha-aṭṭhakathā, Suttanipāta-aṭṭhakathā); Dhammapada-aṭṭhakathā; Paramatthadīpanī (Udāna-aṭṭhakathā, Itivuttaka-aṭṭhakathā, Vimānavatthu-aṭṭhakathā, Petavatthu-aṭṭhakathā, Theragāthā-aṭṭhakathā, Therīgāthā-aṭṭhakathā, Cariyāpiṭaka-aṭṭhakathā); Visuddhajanavilāsinī (Apadāna-aṭṭhakathā); Madhuratthavilāsinī (Buddhavaṃsa-aṭṭhakathā); Jātaka-aṭṭhakathā; Saddhammapajjotikā (Mahāniddesa-aṭṭhakathā, Cūḷaniddesa-aṭṭhakathā); Saddhammappakāsinī (Paṭisambhidāmagga-aṭṭhakathā); Nettippakaraṇa-aṭṭhakathā
- Ṭīkā: Nettippakaraṇa-ṭīkā; Nettivibhāvinī
- Abbreviation: KN

The Khuddaka Nikāya (lit. 'Minor Collection') is the last of the five Nikāyas, or collections, in the Sutta Piṭaka, which is one of the "three baskets" that compose the Pāli Tipiṭaka, the sacred scriptures of Therevāda Buddhism. This nikāya consists of a various number of books, depending on the recension: fifteen in Thailand, fifteen in Sri Lanka (following Buddhaghosa's list), or eighteen in Burma, covering a wide variety of topics. It is attributed to the Buddha and his chief disciples.

The word khuddaka in the title means ‘small’ in Pāli and Nikāya is ‘collection’. The equivalent collection in the Chinese and Tibetan canons is the Kṣudraka Āgama, but there is substantial variation among the collections.

== Historical development ==
Hirakawa Akira has stated that the Khuddaka Nikāya represents a stage in the development of the Pāli Canon/Āgamas in which new material was not added any more to the rest of the Sutta Piṭaka, but was added to a 'Khuddaka Piṭaka' instead. This Khuddaka Piṭaka was the repository for materials that were left out of the four Āgamas/Nikāyas (the Dīgha Nikāya, Majjhima Nikāya, Saṃyutta Nikāya and Aṅguttara Nikāya) and thus included both early and late texts. Some of the other schools that included a Khuddaka Piṭaka in their canons were the Mahīśāsaka, Dharmaguptaka and Mahāsāṃghika. The Khuddaka Nikāya of the Theravāda school is the only complete extant example of such a Khuddaka Piṭaka. Some texts from the Dharmaguptaka Kṣudraka Āgama are preserved in Chinese and Tibetan translation, and fragments of Gandhari versions have also been discovered.

On the dating of the various books in the Khuddaka Nikāya, Oliver Abeynayake notes that:

The Khuddaka Nikaya can easily be divided into two strata, one being early and the other late. The texts Sutta Nipata, Itivuttaka, Dhammapada, Therigatha (Theragatha), Udana and Jataka belong to the early stratum. The texts Khuddakapatha, Vimanavatthu, Petavatthu, Niddesa, Patisambhida, Apadana, Buddhavamsa and Cariyapitaka can be categorized in the later stratum.

== Contents ==
This nikāya contains some or all of the following texts:

1. Khuddakapāṭha
2. Dhammapada
3. Udāna
4. Itivuttaka
5. Sutta Nipāta
6. Vimānavatthu
7. Petavatthu
8. Theragāthā
9. Therīgāthā
10. Jātaka
11. Niddesa
12. Paṭisambhidāmagga
13. Apadāna
14. Buddhavaṃsa
15. Cariyāpiṭaka
16. Nettipakaraṇa or Netti (included in Burmese and Sinhalese editions, but not in Thai edition)
17. Peṭakopadesa (included in Burmese and Sinhalese editions, but not in Thai edition)
18. Milindapañha (included in Burmese edition, but not in Sinhalese and Thai editions)

The introduction to the Sumaṅgalavilāsinī, the commentary on the Dīgha Nikāya compiled in the fourth or fifth century by Buddhaghosa on the basis of earlier commentaries that no longer survive, says that the reciters of the Dīgha listed 2-12 in this nikāya, while the reciters of the Majjhima Nikāya listed 2-15. Later, it gives a listing of the contents of the Canon also found in the introductions to the commentaries on the Vinaya and Abhidhamma Piṭakas, which gives 1-15 for this nikāya, though it also includes an alternative classification in which the Vinaya and Abhidhamma are also included in this nikāya, so that the five nikāyas are a classification of the whole Canon, not just the Sutta Piṭaka. Scholars conclude on the basis of these lists that 13-15 were added later, and 1 later still.

Both surviving subcommentaries on the passage about reciters explain the apparent difference between the reciters as being, not a substantive disagreement on the contents of the Canon, but merely a nominal one on its classification. Thus they say for example that the Dīgha reciters did regard 15 as canonical but counted it as part of 10 instead of a separate book. Similarly, the more recent subcommentary, compiled by the head of the Burmese Saṅgha about two centuries ago, says that 16 and 17 were counted as part of 11 and/or 12.

The full list of 18 books is included in the inscriptions approved by the Burmese Fifth Buddhist council and in the printed edition of the text recited at the Sixth Council.

== Exegesis ==
According to the official edition of the Sixth Buddhist Council, the commentaries (aṭṭhakathā) and sub-commentaries (ṭīkā) on the Khuddakanikāya are organized as follows:

=== Khuddakanikāya-aṭṭhakathā ===
Buddhaghosa

- Paramatthajotikā:
  - Paramatthajotikā I (Khuddakapāṭha-aṭṭhakathā)
  - Paramatthajotikā II (Suttanipāta-aṭṭhakathā)
- Dhammapada-aṭṭhakathā
- Jātaka-aṭṭhakathā

Dhammapāla

- Paramatthadīpanī:
  - Udāna-aṭṭhakathā
  - Itivuttaka-aṭṭhakathā
  - Vimānavatthu-aṭṭhakathā
  - Petavatthu-aṭṭhakathā
  - Theragāthā-aṭṭhakathā
  - Therīgāthā-aṭṭhakathā
  - Cariyāpiṭaka-aṭṭhakathā
- Nettippakaraṇa-aṭṭhakathā

Buddhadatta

- Madhuratthavilāsinī (Buddhavaṃsa-aṭṭhakathā)

Upasena (6th century)

- Saddhammapajjotikā:
  - Mahāniddesa-aṭṭhakathā
  - Cūḷaniddesa-aṭṭhakathā

Mahānāma (5th century)

- Saddhammappakāsinī (Paṭisambhidāmagga-aṭṭhakathā)

Anonymous

- Visuddhajanavilāsinī (Apadāna-aṭṭhakathā)

=== Khuddakanikāya-ṭīkā ===
Dhammapāla

- Nettippakaraṇa-ṭīkā

Saddhammapāla

- Nettivibhāvinī

== Translations ==
The following translations include material from at least two books of the Khuddaka Nikāya. For translations of individual books, see the separate articles.

- Psalms of the Early Buddhists, 9 & 8 tr C. A. F. Rhys Davids, Pali Text Society, Bristol; originally published separately
- Minor Anthologies of the Pali Canon, 1931–75, 4 volumes, Pali Text Society, Bristol; translations of 2, 1, 3, 4, 14, 15, 6, 7
- The Udāna & the Itivuttaka, tr John D. Ireland, Buddhist Publication Society, Kandy, Sri Lanka; originally published separately

== See also ==
- Pāli Canon
- Sutta Piṭaka
- Aṅguttara Nikāya
- Dīgha Nikāya
- Majjhima Nikāya
- Saṃyutta Nikāya
- Aṭṭhakavagga and Pārāyanavagga
- Niddesa
- Early Buddhist Texts
  - Dhammapada
  - Udāna
  - Itivuttaka
  - Sutta Nipāta
  - Theragāthā
  - Therīgāthā
