= Early Buddhist texts =

Parallel texts shared by the Early Buddhist schools

Early Buddhist texts (EBTs), early Buddhist literature or early Buddhist discourses are parallel texts shared by the early Buddhist schools. The most widely studied EBT material are the first four Pali Nikayas, as well as the corresponding Chinese Āgamas. However, some scholars have also pointed out that some Vinaya material, like the Patimokkhas of the different Buddhist schools, as well as some material from the earliest Abhidharma texts could also be quite early.

Besides the large collections in Pali and Chinese, there are also fragmentary collections of EBT materials in Sanskrit, Khotanese, Tibetan, and Gāndhārī. The modern study of early pre-sectarian Buddhism often relies on comparative scholarship using these various early Buddhist sources.

Various scholars of Buddhist studies such as Richard Gombrich, Akira Hirakawa, Alexander Wynne, and A. K. Warder hold that Early Buddhist texts contain material that could possibly be traced to the historical Buddha himself or at least to the early years of pre-sectarian Buddhism. According to the Japanese scholar Akira Hirakawa, "any attempt to ascertain the original teachings of the historical Buddha must be based on this literature."

== Overview ==
Different genres comprise the Early Buddhist texts, including prose "suttas" (Skt: sūtra, discourses), monastic rules (Vinaya), various forms of verse compositions (such as gāthā and udāna), mixed prose and verse works (geya), and also lists (matika) of monastic rules or doctrinal topics. A large portion of Early Buddhist literature is part of the "sutta" or "sutra" genre, these are usually placed in different collections (called Nikayas or Agamas) and constitute the "Sutta Pitaka" (Skt: Sūtra Pitaka, "Basket of sutras") section of the various early Buddhist Canonical collections called Tripitakas ("Three Baskets"). The suttas generally contain doctrinal, spiritual, and philosophical content.

There are EBTs from various Buddhist schools, especially from the Theravada and Sarvāstivāda schools, but also from the Dharmaguptaka, Mahāsāṅghika, Mahīśāsaka, Mūlasarvāstivāda, and other texts of uncertain prominence.

According to Oskar von Hinüber, the main purpose for the composition of the EBTs was to "preserve and to defend an orthodox tradition." He adds that this literary effort was influenced by the Vedic prose of the Brāhmaṇas. As noted by von Hinüber, these collections also contain the first ever Indian texts to commemorate historical events, such as the Mahāparinibbānasuttanta, which recounts the death of the Buddha. The early suttas also almost always open by introducing the geographical location of the event they depict, including ancient place names, always preceded by the phrase "thus have I heard" (evaṃ me sutaṃ).

The textual evidence from various traditions shows that by the 1st century BCE to the fourth century CE, slight differences developed among these parallel documents and that these differences reflected "school affiliation, local traditions, linguistic environment, nonstandardized scripts, or any combination of these factors."

=== Orality ===
These texts were initially transmitted through oral methods. According to Marcus Bingenheimer,

After the death of the founder, Buddhist texts were transmitted orally in Middle Indo-Aryan dialects (Prakrits). While the southern tradition eventually settled on one of these dialects, Pāli, as its canonical language, in India and Central Asia Buddhist texts were successively Sanskritized and/or translated into other languages such as Chinese, Tokharian, Khotanese, Sogdian, and Tibetan. Also, new Buddhist texts in India, from at least the third century onward, were directly composed in standard Sanskrit. Manuscripts from the northern tradition, especially those of Central Asian provenance, are therefore often in Prakrit (especially Gāndhārī) or some nonstandard form of Sanskrit, sometimes called Buddhist Sanskrit, an intermediate stage between some Prakrit and standard Sanskrit.

As noted by Mark Allon there are various reasons why these texts are held to have been transmitted orally by modern scholars. These include internal evidence from the texts themselves which indicates that they were to be memorized and recited, the lack of any evidence (whether archeological or internal to the texts) that writing was being used to preserve these texts, and the stylistic features of the texts themselves.

An important feature that marks the Early Buddhist texts are formal characteristics which reflect their origin as orally transmitted literature such as the use of repetition and rhetorical formulas. Other stylistic features which betray orality include: the use of multiple synonyms, standardized phrases and passages, verse summaries similies, numbered lists, and standard framing narratives.

These stylistic features are in contrast to later works such as Mahayana sutras, which contain more elaborate and complex narratives, that would be more difficult to memorize. Also, the EBTs are always historically situated in ancient Indian locales, unlike many later Mahayana works, which depict themselves as being taught by the Buddha in heavenly realms or other supernatural circumstances.

Early Buddhist texts are believed to have been transmitted by lineages of bhāṇaka, monks who specialized in memorization and recitation of particular collections of texts, until they were eventually recorded in writing after the 1st Century BCE. As noted by Alexander Wynne:

Although there is no evidence for writing before Aśoka, the accuracy of oral transmission should not be underestimated. The Buddhist community was full of Brahmins who knew that the Vedic educational system had transmitted a mass of difficult texts, verbatim, in an increasingly archaic language, for more than a thousand years. Since the early Buddhists required a different means of oral transmission, for quite different texts, other mnemonic techniques were developed, based on communal chanting (saṅgīti). The texts explicitly state that this method was to be employed, and their actual form shows that it was, on a grand scale.

Some scholars such as Wynne and Analayo generally hold that these texts were memorized in fixed form, to be recited verbatim (in contrast to other forms of oral literature, such as epic poetry) and that this was affirmed during communal recitations (where there is little room for improvisation), while others argue that they could have been performed in more poetic and improvisational ways (L.S. Cousins, Rupert Gethin) through the use of basic lists or formulas.

The EBTs also show the influence of Vedic texts, including the adoption of certain Vedic poetic metres, as well as forms of organization (using topic and number). EBTs share similar terminology and ideas with Vedic texts. They also share certain metaphors and imagery with texts like the Bṛhadāraṇyaka Upaniṣad, such as the single salty taste of the ocean (AN 8.157 vs. Bṛhadāraṇyaka 2.4.11).

=== Setting and date ===
Gangetic plain during the pre-Nanda era

Regarding the setting, the EBTs generally depict the world of the second urbanisation period, which features small scale towns and villages, and small competing states (the mahajanapadas) with a lower level of urbanisation compared to that of the Mauryan era. As such, the EBTs depict the Gangetic Plain before the rise of the Nanda empire, who unified all these small competing states during the 4th century.

They also depict Pataliputra as the small village of Pataligama, while it would later become the capital of the Mauryan empire and the largest city in India. They do not mention Ashoka but they mention the Jain leader Mahavira (a.k.a. Nātaputta) as a contemporary of the Buddha.

The EBTs also depict a small scale local economy, during a time before the establishment of the long-distance trading networks, as noted by Brahmali and Sujato:

King Pasenadi of Kosala is said to have used kāsi sandalwood (MN 87.28), indicating that even the highest social strata used locally produced luxuries. This situation is perhaps to be expected given the political divisions in North India at the time, which may have complicated long-distance trade.

As noted by von Hinüber, the omission of any mention of the Mauryas in EBTs such as the Mahāparinibbānasuttanta, in contrast to other later Buddhist texts which do mention them, is also evidence of its pre-Mauryan date:

Given the importance of the rise of the Maurya empire even under Candragupta, who is better known for his inclination towards Jainism, one might conjecture that the latest date for the composition of the Mahāparinibbānasuttanta, at least for this part of it, is around 350 to 320 BC.

According to Alexander Wynne,

The corresponding pieces of textual material found in the canons of the different sects... probably go back to pre-sectarian times. It is unlikely that these correspondences could have been produced by the joint endeavour of different Buddhist sects, for such an undertaking would have required organisation on a scale which was simply inconceivable in the ancient world.

=== Archeology ===
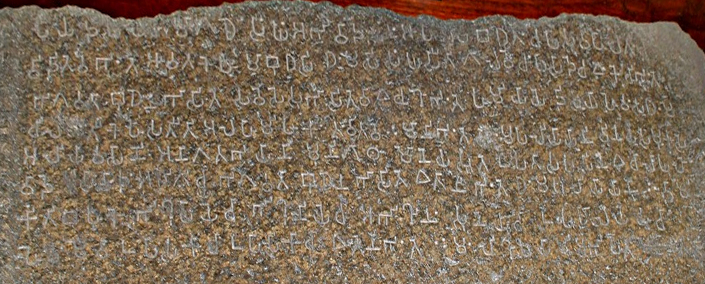
Ashoka Minor Rock Edict No. 3

The Edicts of Ashoka are some of the earliest Indian historical documents and they agree with the EBTs in some respects.

According to Sujato, the MPE 2 (Sārnāth) edict makes use of various EBT specific terms such as: "bhikhusaṁgha, bhikhuni-saṁgha, sāsana, upāsaka, anuposatha, saṁgha bheta, saṁgha samaga (Sāñcī version), cila-thitīka (Sāñcī)."

Sujato also notes that the RE 5 (Kālsī) edict states: "Good deeds are difficult to perform," "bad acts are easy to commit", which could be a quote from the Udana (5:8). Likewise, the RE 9 (Girnār) edict states "there is no gift like the gift of the Dhamma", which could be a quote from the EBTs (see AN 9:5 or Dhp 354).

A. Wynne notes that Minor Rock Edict #3 mentions some Buddhist texts which have been identified and which might show that at the time of Ashoka (304–232 BCE) these were already fixed. These citations include the "Rāhulāvada", which could refer to the Ambalaṭṭhikā Rāhulovāda Sutta (MN 61).

Some early archeological sites like the Bharhut stupa (most visible material dates from the 1st or 2nd century BCE) contain many details from the EBTs such as: the mention of Buddha Gotama and all five past Buddhas of the EBTs, as well as kings Ajātasatru and Pasenadi. Major events from the Buddha's life from the EBTs are mentioned such as his awakening, the first teaching and his death. According to Lüders "… the visit of Ajātasattu [to the Buddha] is depicted even in details exactly according to the Sāmaññaphala Sutta," and "… the representation of the visit of Sakka follows the text of the Sakkapañha Sutta."

Other Indian inscriptions from the 1st and 2nd century CE include terms such as dhamma-kathika, peṭakin, and suttantika, indicating the existence of a Buddhist literature during this time.

== Extant material ==
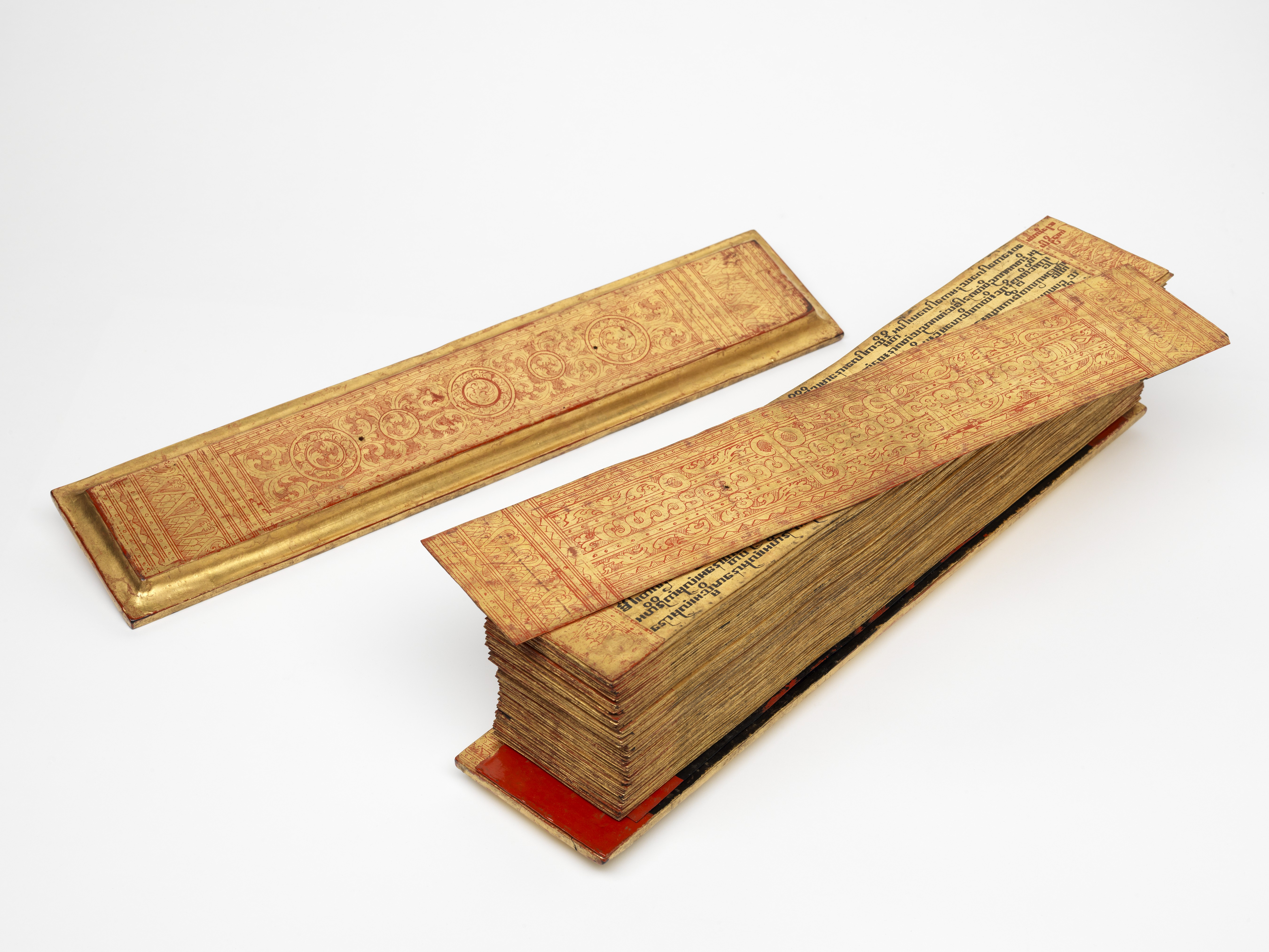
Burmese-Pali Palm-leaf manuscript

Most modern scholarship has generally focused on the Pāli Nikāyas (which have been fully translated into Western languages) and the Chinese Āgamas (only partially translated). As early as the late 19th century, it was known that the Nikāyas and the Āgamas contain a great number of parallel texts. In 1882, Samuel Beal published his Buddhist Literature in China, where he wrote:

The Parinibbāna, the Brahmajāla, the Sigalovada, the Dhammacakka, the Kasi-Bhāradvadja, the Mahāmangala; all these I have found and compared with translations from the Pali, and find that in the main they are identical. I do not say literally the same; they differ in minor points, but are identical in plot and all important details. And when the Vinaya and Āgama collections are thoroughly examined, I can have little doubt we shall find most if not all the Pali suttas in a Chinese form.

During the 20th century various scholars including Anesaki Masaharu and Akanuma Chizen began critical studies of these correspondences. Probably the most important early works in the comparative study of these two collections are Anesaki's The Four Buddhist Āgamas in Chinese – A Concordance of their Parts and of the Corresponding Counterparts in the Pāli Nikāyas and Akanuma's The Comparative Catalogue of Chinese Āgamas and Pāli Nikāyas.

Over time this comparative study of these parallel Buddhist texts became incorporated into modern scholarship on Buddhism, such as in the work of Etienne Lamotte (1988), who commented on their close relationship:

However, with the exception of the Mahāyanist interpolations in the Ekottara, which are easily discernable, the variations in question [between the Nikāyas and Āgamas] affect hardly anything save the method of expression or the arrangement of the subjects. The doctrinal basis common to the Nikāyas and Āgamas is remarkably uniform. Preserved and transmitted by the schools, the sūtras do not, however, constitute scholastic documents, but are the common heritage of all the sects.

Bhiksu Thich Minh Chau (1918– 2012) conducted a comparative study (1991) of the contents in the Theravada Majjhima Nikaya and Sarvastivada Madhyama Agama and concluded that despite some differences in technical and practical issues, there was a striking agreement in doctrinal matters. A more recent study by Bhikkhu Analayo also agrees with this position. Analayo argues the Majjhima Nikaya and Madhyama Agama contain mostly the same major doctrines.

Recent work has also been done on other more fragmentary materials surviving in Sanskrit, Tibetan, and Gandhāran collections. Andrew Glass has compared a small number of Gandhāran sutras with their Tibetan, Pali, Sanskrit, and Chinese parallels and concludes that there is a unity in their doctrines, despite some technical differences.

According to some Asian scholars like Yin Shun, Mizuno Kogen and Mun-Keat Choong, the common ancestor of the Samyutta Nikaya and the Samyukta Agama is the basis for the other EBTs. The main evidence in support of this proposal appears to be a reference in the Vastusaṃgrahaṇī of the Yogācārabhūmi to the structure of the Saṃyukta Āgama as reflecting an allocation of discourses according to speaker, topic, and audience (一是能說, 二是所說, 三是所為說) and a reference in the Mahāsuññata-sutta (and its Chinese parallel), MN 122, to just the first three aṅgas: sutta geyya veyyākaraṇa.

Several problems with this theory have been identified by other scholars. A minor problem is the divergence between the supposed function of the three aṅgas and the traditional understanding of their implications. A more central problem is that there is no evidence in support of the assumption that the transition from a single āgama as a reference to the texts gradually accumulating during the time the Buddha was still alive to a division into four such āgamas reportedly undertaken soon after his demise ever involved an intermediate stage in which the aṅgas, whatever their count, serves as a means for assembling different discourses. Another significant problem is that the listing of three aṅgas occurs in a context in the Mahāsuññata-sutta that could not have intended a reference to a division of the body of texts as known at that time, as on such a reading the passage becomes self-contradictory. Yet another problem is that the three categories mentioned in the Vastusaṃgrahaṇī of the Yogācārabhūmi are complementary, as every discourses has a speaker, takes up some topic, and is addressed to some audience. It follows that these three categories cannot meaningfully be used to divide a body of discourses into three distinct sections.

=== Pāli EBTs ===
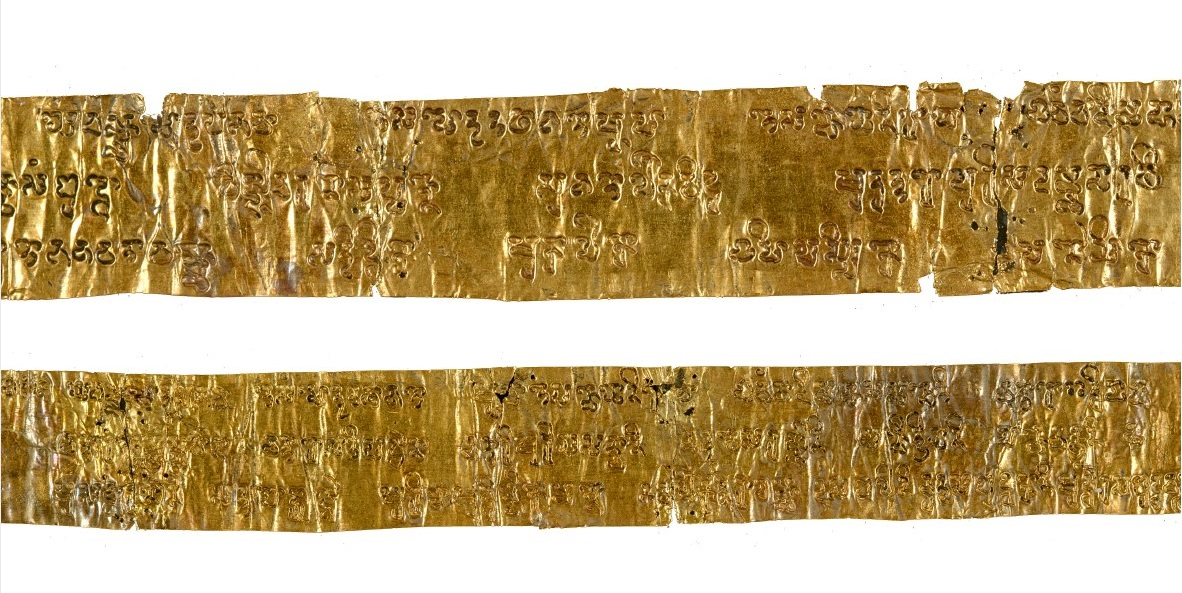
Gold Plates containing fragments of the Pali Tipitaka (5th century) found in Maunggan (a village near the city of Sriksetra)

The Pāli Canon of the Theravada school contains the most complete fully extant collection of EBTs in an Indic language which has survived until today. According to the Theravada tradition, after having been passed down orally, it was first written down in the first century BCE in Sri Lanka.

While some scholars such as Gregory Schopen are skeptical of the antiquity of the Pali texts, Alexander Wynne notes that:

Canonical fragments are included in the Golden Pāli Text, found in a reliquary from Śrī kṣetra dating to the late 3rd or early 4th century AD; they agree almost exactly with extant Pāli manuscripts. This means that the Pāli Tipiṭaka has been transmitted with a high degree of accuracy for well over 1,500 years. There is no reason why such an accurate transmission should not be projected back a number of centuries, at the least to the period when it was written down in the first century BC, and probably further.

The Early Buddhist material in the Pāli Canon mainly consists of the first four Pāli Nikāyas, the Patimokkha (basic list of monastic rules) and other Vinaya material as well as some parts of the Khuddaka Nikāya (mainly Sutta Nipata, Itivuttaka, Dhammapada, Therigatha, Theragatha, and the Udana).

These texts have been widely translated into Western languages.

=== Chinese EBTs ===
The EBTs preserved in the Chinese Buddhist canon include the Āgamas, collections of sutras which parallel the Pali Nikāyas in content as well as structure. There are also some differences between the discourses and collections as modern comparative studies has shown, such as omissions of material, additions and shifts in the location of phrases. These various Agamas possibly come down to us from the Sarvastivada (the Samyukta and Madhyama Agamas), Dharmaguptaka and Kasyayipa schools. The Mahasamghika Vinaya Pitaka also survives in Chinese translation. Some of the Agamas have been translated into English by the Āgama Research Group (ARG) at the Dharma Drum Institute of Liberal Arts.

The language of these texts is a form of Ancient Chinese termed Buddhist Chinese (fójiào Hànyǔ 佛教漢語) or Buddhist Hybrid Chinese (fójiào hùnhé Hànyǔ 佛教混合漢語) which shows considerable vernacularity. Buddhist Chinese also shows a significant number of elements which derive from the source language, including calques and phonological transcriptions. Scholarly analysis of these texts have shown that they were translated from Middle Indic Prakrit source languages, with varying degrees of sanskritisation.

While the other Chinese Agamas are mostly doctrinally consistent with the Pali Nikayas, the Ekottara Agama (EA) has been seen by various scholars such as Johannes Bronkhorst and Etienne Lamotte as being influenced by later Mahayana concepts. According to Lamotte, these 'interpolations' are easily discernible. According to Analayo, the most often proposed hypothesis is that the EA derives from the Mahasamgika school.

=== Gandhari and Bactrian EBTs ===
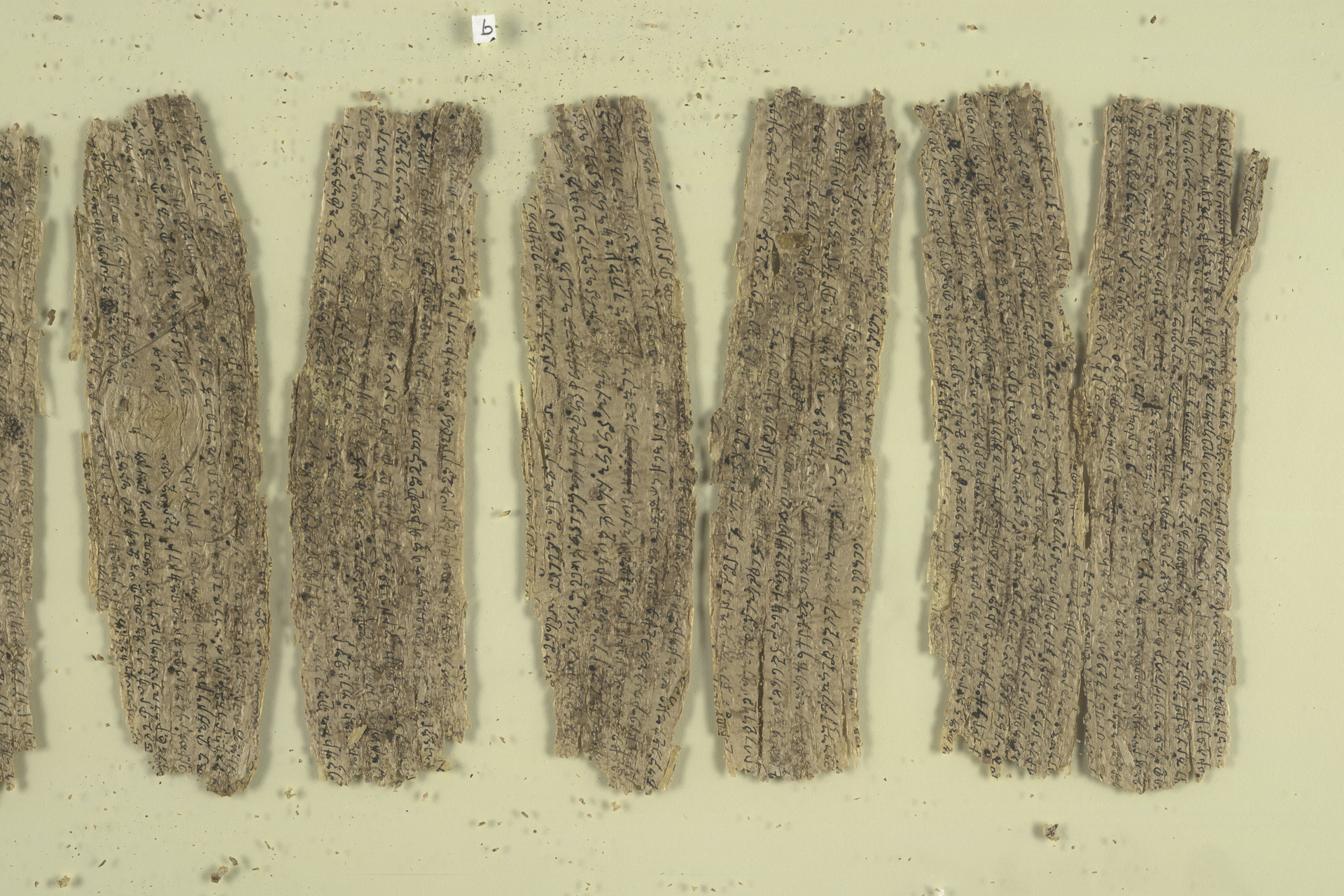
Gandhara birchbark scroll fragments (c. 1st century) from British Library Collection

Modern discoveries of various fragmentary manuscript collections (the Gandhāran Buddhist texts) from Pakistan and Afghanistan has contributed significantly to the study of Early Buddhist texts.

Most of these texts are written in the Gandhari Language and the Kharoṣṭhī script, but some have also been discovered in Bactrian. According to Mark Allon, the Gandhāran Buddhist texts contain several EBTs which parallel those found in other collections "such as the Ekottarikāgama and Vana-saṃyutta of the Saṃyutta-nikāya/Saṃyuktāgama."

These texts include a parallel to the Anattalakkhana Sutta, possibly belonging to the Dharmaguptaka school. A few publications have translated some of these texts.

According to Mark Allon, the most recent major finds include the following collections:

- "The British Library Kharoṣṭhī Manuscripts", Birch bark scrolls in the Gandhari Language and the Kharoṣṭhī script, possibly belonging to the Dharmaguptaka school. They include prose sutras and verse works like parts of the Dharmapada dating to the 1st century CE, making them the earliest EBT manuscripts discovered.
- "The Senior Kharoṣṭhī Manuscripts", Birch bark scrolls in the Gandhari Language and the Kharoṣṭhī script, possibly belonging to the Dharmaguptaka school. Most of these preserve "canonical" prose sutras, as well as some biographical material on the Buddha's life associated with the Vinaya.
- "The Schøyen Manuscripts", discovered in the Bamiyan caves, a collection which preserves Early Buddhist, Abhidharma, and Mahayana texts in either Sanskrit or Gandhari.

=== Sanskrit EBTs ===
According to Mark Allon, an important recent find is "a substantial portion of a large Sanskrit birch bark manuscript of the Dirghagama, the division of the canon containing long discourses, belonging to the (Mula)-Sarvastivada school, which dates to the seventh or eighth centuries AD". This Gilgit Dīrgha Āgama contains forty-seven discourses and it includes some sutras not found in Pali at all, like the Māyājāla sutra, the Catuṣpariṣat-sūtra, and the Arthavistara-sūtra.

The Arthaviniścaya Sūtra is a composite text that is mainly made up of early Buddhist material organized into an Abhidharma type list.

Sanskrit fragments of different early Buddhist Agamas also survive from various sources, including archaeological finds in the Tarim Basin and the city of Turfan. These finds include versions of a Sanskrit Udanavarga. Other Sanskrit Agama texts include the (non-Mahayana) Mahāparinirvāṇasutra, and the Pratītyasamutpādādivibhaṅganirdeśa.

Various Vinaya texts also survive in Sanskrit, including those of the Sarvāstivāda Vinaya and the Mūlasarvāstivāda Vinaya. The Lalitavistara Sūtra, though including much later additions, also includes some EBT parallel passages, including passages on the first sermon at Varanasi.

=== Mahāsāṃghika sources ===
The first schism among the Buddhist community was between the so-called Sthaviras ("Elders") and the Mahāsāṃghika ("Great Community"). Some scholars such as Edward Conze have thus emphasized the importance of EBTs that have parallels in both Sthavira and Mahāsāṅghika sources. However, fewer Mahāsāṃghika texts have survived in comparison to Sthavira material.

One important source for Mahāsāṃghika EBTs is the Mahāvastu ("Great Event"). This is a mythic life of the Buddha which includes many legendary tales but also includes various EBTs parallels.

There are also fragments of the Mahāparinirvāṇa and Caṁgi (Pali: Caṅki) sutras of the Mahāsāṃghika dating to the 3rd–4th century.

The Śālistamba Sūtra (rice stalk sūtra) is an early Buddhist text which has been tied to the Mahāsāṃghika school, it contains many parallel passages to the Pali suttas. As noted by N. Ross Reat, this text is in general agreement with the basic doctrines of the Sthavira EBTs such as dependent origination, the "middle way" between eternalism and annihilationism, the "five aggregates", the "three unwholesome roots", the four noble truths, and the noble eightfold path.

There are also various Mahāsāṃghika Vinaya texts which contain early material, including their Prātimokṣa monastic code, which is almost identical with Sthavira pātimokkhas.

The Chinese Ekottara Āgama (增壹阿含經; pinyin: zēngyī-ahánjīng) has been attributed to the Mahāsāṃghikas by various scholars, though this attribution remains uncertain.

=== Abhidharma ===
The various Abhidharma texts and collections (Pitakas) are considered by scholars to be (mostly) later material (3rd century BCE onwards) and thus are not EBTs. In spite of the relative lateness of the Abhidharma works, according to scholars like Erich Frauwallner, there are kernels of early pre-sectarian material in the earliest layer of the Abhidharma literature, such as in the Theravada Vibhanga, the Dharmaskandha of the Sarvastivada, and the Śāriputrābhidharma of the Dharmaguptaka school. According to Frauwallner's comparative study, these texts were possibly developed and "constructed from the same material", mainly early Buddhist doctrinal lists (Pali: mātikā, Sanskrit: mātṛkā) which forms the "ancient core" of early Abhidharma.

=== Narrative genres ===
Some narrative texts which discuss the past lives of the Buddha and other figures, mainly the Jatakas and Avadanas, could also be considered early Buddhist texts. According to Peter Skilling, the Jataka genre is "one of the oldest classes of Buddhist literature." Sarah Shaw writes that the earliest part of the Pali Jātakas, the verse portions, are "considered amongst the very earliest part of the Pali tradition and date from the fifth century BCE." "Jataka" appears as part of an ancient schema of Buddhist literature called the nine genres of the Buddha's teaching (navaṅga-buddhasāsana), and depictions of them appear in early Indian art and inscriptions (as early as the second century B.C.E.) seen in sites such as Sanchi and Bharhut. According to Martin Straube, while these narratives cannot be dated in a precise manner, "the fact that many narratives are passed on in almost identical form within the canons of the different schools shows that they date back to the time before the schisms between the schools took place." According to A. K. Warder, jātakas are the precursors to the various legendary biographies of the Buddha, which were composed at later dates.

=== Other sources ===
There are various EBTs collected in the Tibetan Kangyur. Peter Skilling has published English translations of these texts in his two volume "Mahasutras" (Pāli Text Society, 1994). According to 84000.co, a site of Tibetan Canon translations, the Degé Kangyur catalogue states that sutras Toh 287–359 of the General Sutra section are "Śrāvakayāna" works "probably extracted from the Āgamas of the Mūlasarvāstivāda".

Another important source of early Buddhist material in the Tibetan canon are numerous quotations by Śamathadeva in his Abhidharmakośopāyikā-ṭīkā (Derge no. 4094 / Peking no. 5595), a commentary to the Abhidharmakosha. Some of this material is available in English translation by Bhikkhunī Dhammadinnā.

Mahayana treatises also sometimes quote EBTs. According to Etienne Lamotte, the Dà zhìdù lùn cites "about a hundred sūtras of the Lesser Vehicle; the majority are borrowed from the Āgama collections." The massive Yogācārabhūmi-Śāstra contains a section titled Vastusaṃgrahaṇī (Compendium of Themes) which includes summaries of key topics found in each sutra of the Samyukta-āgama, as well as the topics of the Vinaya and doctrinal lists (Mātṛka).

Numerous sutra quotations by authors of Sautrantika treatises are also a source of EBT fragments. The Sautrantika school was known for focusing on using examples from and references to EBT sutras. These works include Kumaralata's Drstantapankti, the Abhidharmamrtara-sasastra attributed to Ghosaka, the Abhidharmavatara-sastra attributed to Skandhila and the Tattvasiddhi of Harivarman.

The Tibetan canon also includes a large Mūlasarvāstivāda text called The Application of Mindfulness of the Sacred Dharma (Saddharmasmṛtyupasthāna, Toh 287). This text contains some EBT passages, including a section on mindfulness of the body (ch. 5), a section on the ten paths of wholesome action (ch. 1) and a passage (in ch. 2) which is similar to the Discourse on Distinguishing the Six Elements (Saddhatuvibhangasutra, MA 162) according to Daniel Malinowski Stuart. There are also further passages in chapter two describing the contemplation of impurity, loving-kindness and pratityasamutpada.

== See also ==
- Buddhist texts
- Four Noble Truths
- Noble Eightfold Path
- Dependent Origination
- Pāli Canon
- Buddhavacana
- Sutta Pitaka
- Vinaya Pitaka
- Āgama
- Sutta Nipata
- Itivuttaka
- Dhammapada
- Therigatha
- Theragatha
- Udana
