= Apadana (disambiguation) =

Apadana may refer to:

- Apadana, a large hypostyle hall at Persepolis and the palace of Susa
- Apadāna, a collection of biographical stories found in the Khuddaka Nikaya of the Pāli Canon, the scriptures of Theravada Buddhism
- Apadana Complex, a large residential complex in western part of Tehran, Iran
- Apadana Stadium, a multi-purpose stadium in Tehran, Iran
