= Buddhist texts =

Historic literature and religious texts of Buddhism

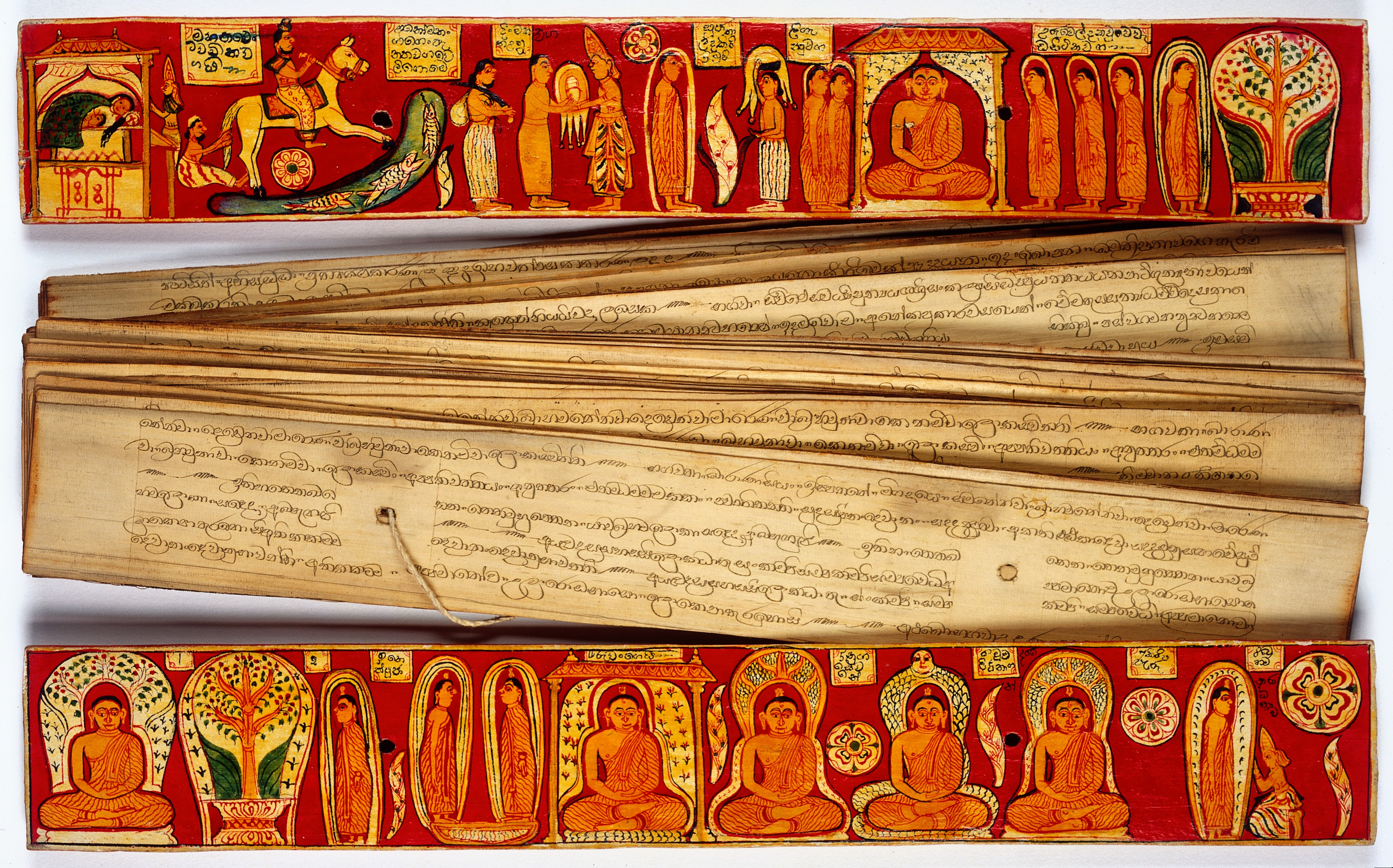
Illustrated Sinhalese covers and palm-leaf pages, depicting the events between the Bodhisattva's renunciation and the request by Brahmā Sahampati that he teach the Dharma after the Buddha's awakening

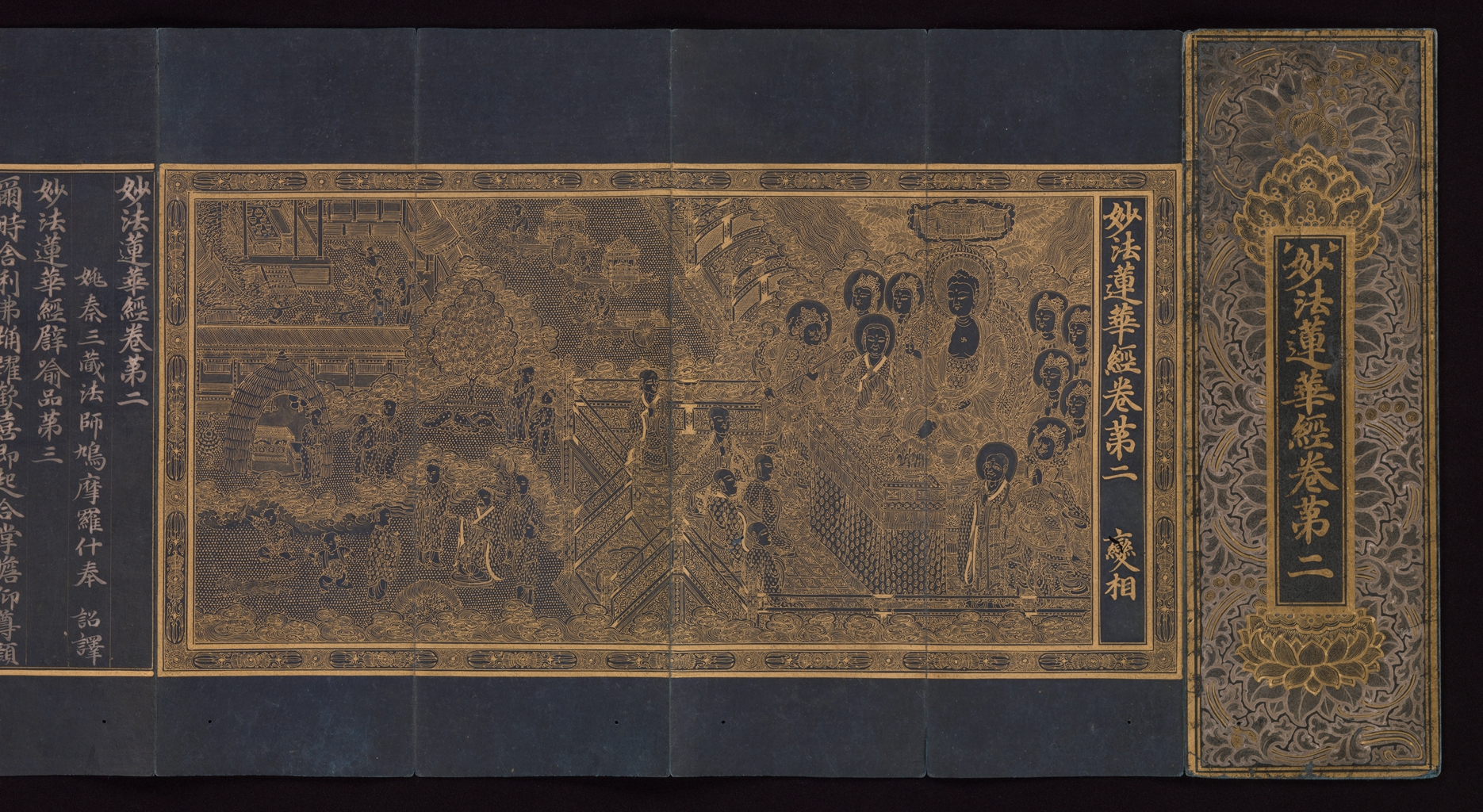
Illustrated Lotus Sūtra from Korea; circa 1340, accordion-format book; gold and silver on indigo-dyed mulberry paper

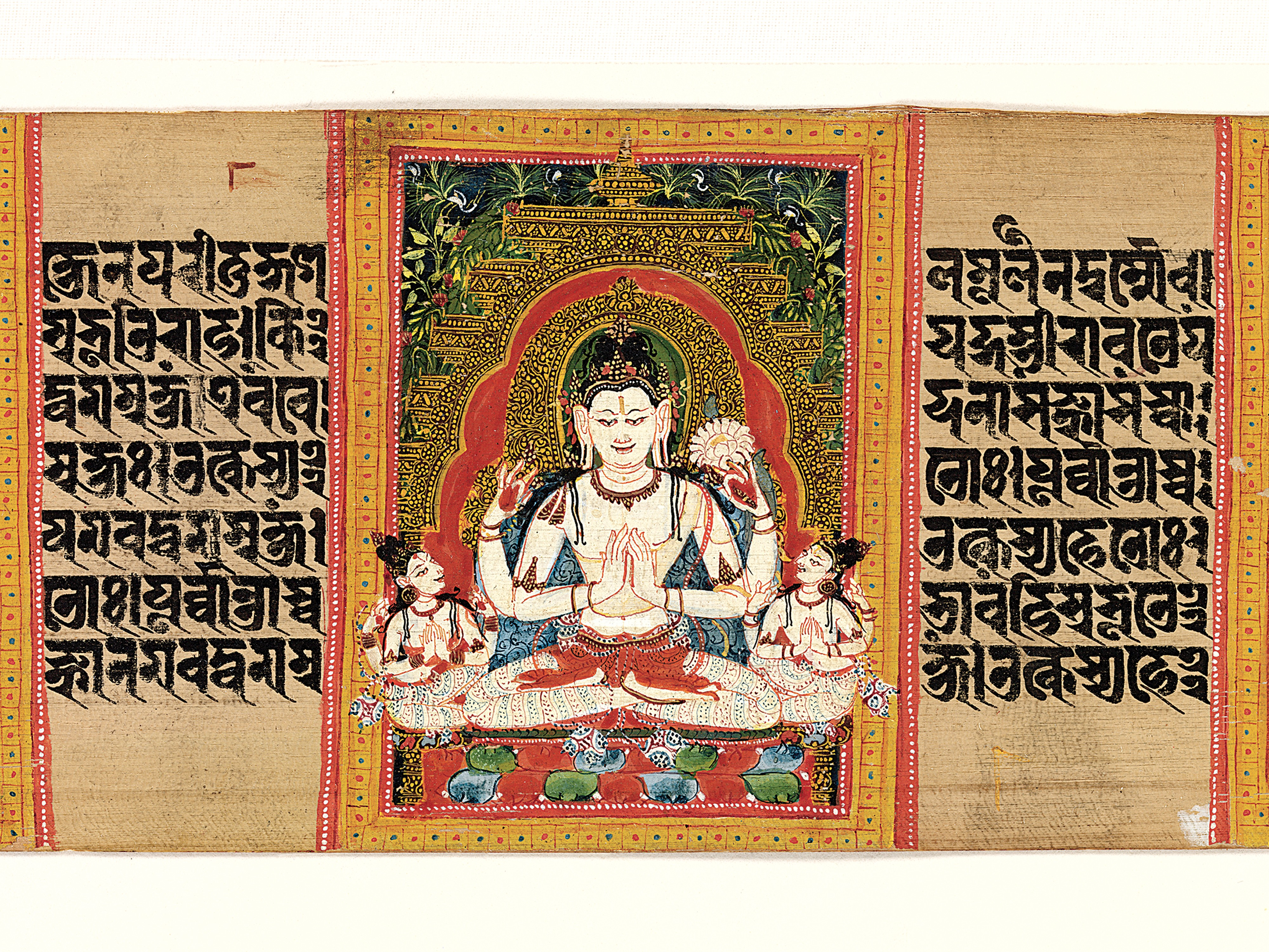
Folio from a manuscript of the Aṣṭasāhasrikā Prajñāpāramitā Sūtra depicting Shadakshari Lokesvara, early 12th century, opaque watercolor on palm leaf

Buddhist texts are religious texts that belong to, or are associated with, Buddhism and its traditions. There is no single textual collection for all of Buddhism. Instead, there are three main Buddhist Canons: the Pāli Canon of the Theravāda tradition, the Chinese Buddhist Canon used in East Asian Buddhist tradition, and the Tibetan Buddhist Canon used in Indo-Tibetan Buddhism.

The earliest Buddhist texts were not committed to writing until some centuries after the death of Gautama Buddha. The oldest surviving Buddhist manuscripts are the Gandhāran Buddhist texts, found in Pakistan and written in Gāndhārī, they date from the first century BCE to the third century CE. The first Buddhist texts were initially passed on orally by Buddhist monastics, but were later written down and composed as manuscripts in various Indo-Aryan languages (such as Pāli, Gāndhārī, and Buddhist Hybrid Sanskrit). These texts were collected into various collections and translated into other languages such as Buddhist Chinese (fójiào hànyǔ 佛教漢語) and Classical Tibetan as Buddhism spread outside of India.

Buddhist texts can be categorized in a number of ways. The Western terms "scripture" and "canonical" are applied to Buddhism in inconsistent ways by Western scholars: for example, one authority refers to "scriptures and other canonical texts", while another says that scriptures can be categorized into canonical, commentarial, and pseudo-canonical. Buddhist traditions have generally divided these texts with their own categories and divisions, such as that between buddhavacana "word of the Buddha," many of which are known as "sutras", and other texts, such as "shastras" (treatises) or "Abhidharma".

These religious texts were written in different languages, methods and writing systems. Memorizing, reciting and copying the texts was seen as spiritually valuable. Even after the development and adoption of printing by Buddhist institutions, Buddhists continued to copy them by hand as a spiritual exercise, a practice known as sutra copying.

In an effort to preserve these scriptures, Asian Buddhist institutions were at the forefront of the adoption of Chinese technologies related to bookmaking, including paper, and block printing which were often deployed on a large scale. Because of this, the first surviving example of a printed text is a Buddhist charm, the first full printed book is the Buddhist Diamond Sutra (c. 868) and the first hand colored print is an illustration of Guanyin dated to 947.

== Buddhavacana ==
The concept of buddhavacana (word of the Buddha) is important in understanding how Buddhists classify and see their texts. Buddhavacana texts have special status as sacred scripture and are generally seen as in accord with the teachings of the historical Buddha, which is termed "the Dharma". According to Donald Lopez, the criteria for determining what should be considered buddhavacana were developed at an early stage, and that the early formulations do not suggest that Dharma is limited to what was spoken by the historical Buddha. Another term for "buddha word" is the "dispensation of the Buddha" (buddhānuśāsanam).

The Mahāsāṃghika and the Mūlasarvāstivāda considered both the Buddha's discourses and those of his disciples to be buddhavacana. A number of different beings such as Buddhas, disciples of the Buddha, ṛṣis, and devas were considered capable of transmitting buddhavacana. According to early Buddhist sources like the Mahāpadesasutta, a text said by someone other than the Buddha may be certified as true buddhavacana by four "great references to authority" (mahāpadeśa): (1) the buddha himself (who often certified the statements of others as buddhavacana in the sutras), (2) a sangha of wise elders, (3) a small group of specialist monks (dharmadharas or vinayadharas), or (4) one elder knowledgeable in the Dharma. The content of such a discourse was then to be collated with the sūtras, compared with the Vinaya, and evaluated against the nature of the Dharma. This allowed a certain flexibility in the compilation of the Buddhist canons, which were not necessarily closed after the Buddha's death.

In Theravāda Buddhism, the standard collection of buddhavacana is the Pāli Canon, also known as the Tripiṭaka ("three baskets"). Generally speaking, the Theravāda school rejects the Mahāyāna sūtras as buddhavacana (word of the Buddha), and do not study or see these texts as reliable sources. In East Asian Buddhism, what is considered buddhavacana is collected in the Chinese Buddhist canon; the most common edition of this is the Taishō Tripiṭaka, itself based on the Tripiṭaka Koreana. This collection, unlike the Pāli Tripiṭaka, contains Mahāyāna sūtras, Śāstras (scholastic treatises), and Esoteric Buddhist literature.

Mahāyāna Buddhist sources generally tended to be more liberal in their interpretation of buddhavacana, allowing for more texts to be included (especially the Mahāyāna sūtras). As such, Mahayana sources often see buddhavacana as referring to statements which are well spoken and thus reflect the truth of the Dharma. For example, the Adhyāśayasañcodanasūtra states: "All which is well-spoken, Maitreya, is spoken by the Buddha." According to the sūtra, "well spoken" (subhāsita) means that inspired speech should be seen as buddhavacana if it is in accord with four principles:

- being meaningful and not meaningless,
- being principled and not unprincipled,
- bringing about the extinction of the defilements and not their increase,
- it explains the qualities and benefits of nirvana, not the qualities and benefits of samsara.

According to Hsuan Hua from the tradition of Chinese Buddhism, there are five types of beings who may speak the sutras of Buddhism: a Buddha, a disciple of a Buddha, a deva, a ṛṣi, or an emanation of one of these beings; however, they must first receive certification from a buddha that its contents are true Dharma. Then these sutras may be properly regarded as buddhavacana. Sometimes texts that are considered commentaries by some are regarded by others as buddhavacana.

In Indo-Tibetan Buddhism, what is considered buddhavacana is collected in the Kangyur ('The Translation of the Word'). The East Asian and Tibetan Buddhist Canons always combined buddhavacana with other literature in their standard collected editions. However, the general view of what is and is not buddhavacana is broadly similar between East Asian Buddhism and Tibetan Buddhism. The Tibetan Kangyur, which belongs to the various schools of Tibetan Vajrayāna Buddhism, in addition to containing sutras and Vinaya, also contains Buddhist tantras and other related Tantric literature.

== The texts of the early Buddhist schools ==
=== Early Buddhist texts ===
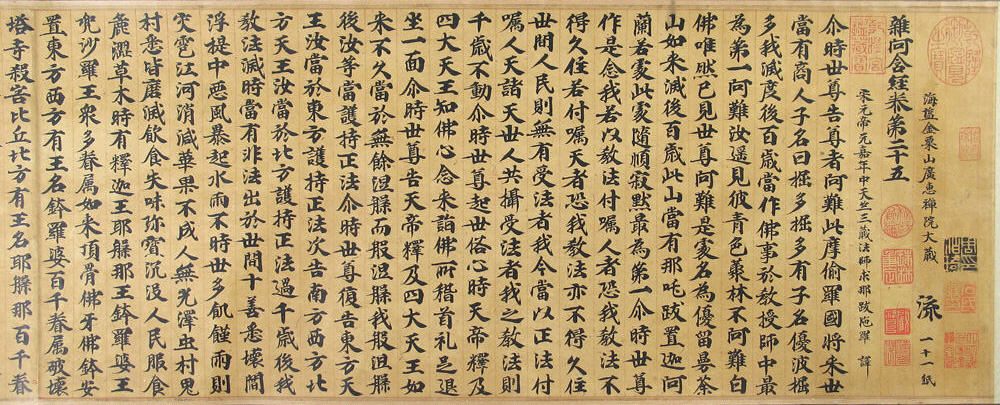
Samyutagama Sūtra, Medieval China, 11th century

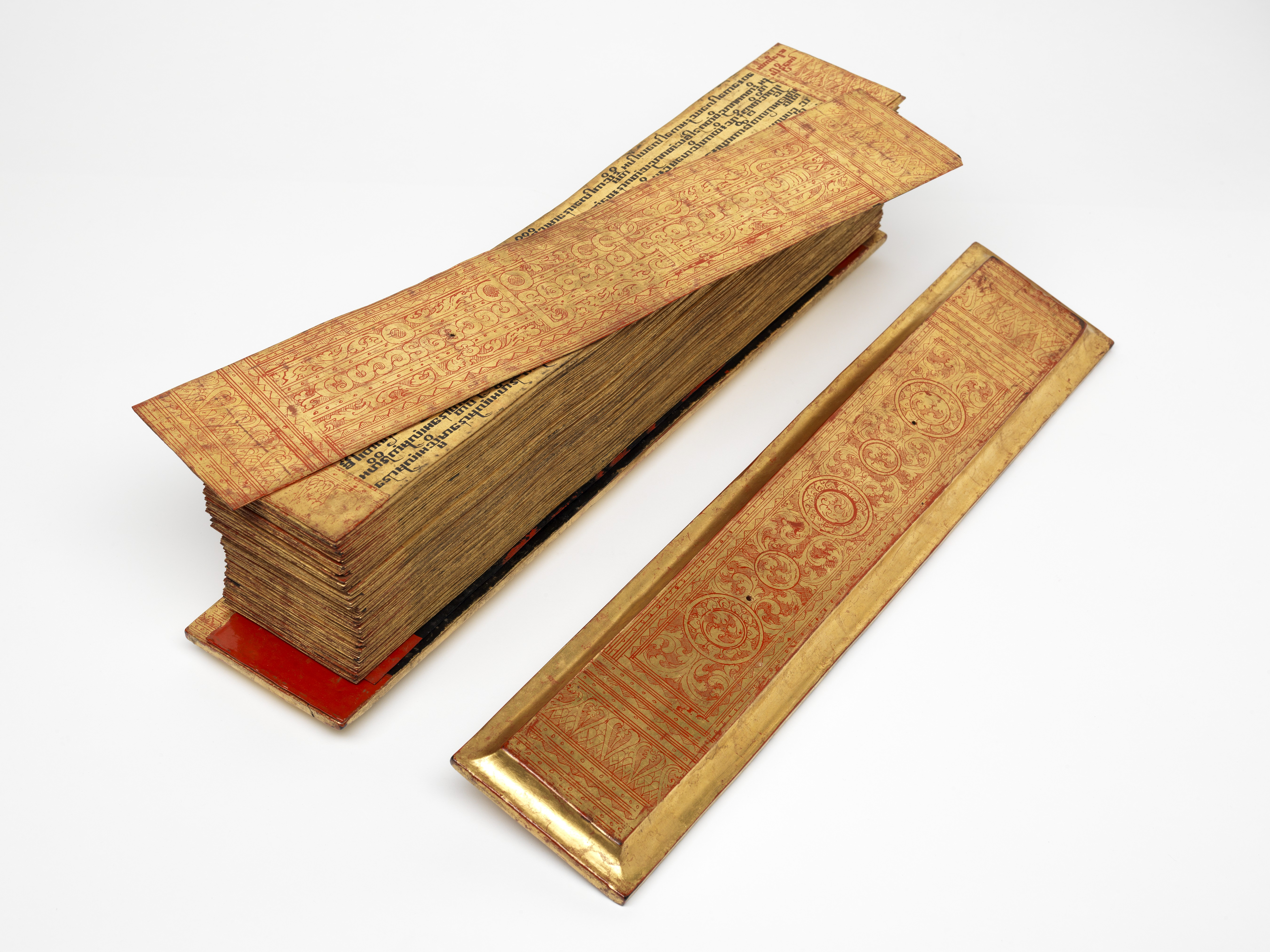
Burmese Pāli manuscript

The earliest Buddhist texts were passed down orally in Middle Indo-Aryan languages called Prakrits, including Gāndhārī language, the early Magadhan language and Pāli through the use of repetition, communal recitation and mnemonic devices. These texts were later compiled into canons and written down in manuscripts. For example, the Pāli Canon was preserved in Sri Lanka where it was first written down in the first century BCE.

There are early texts from various Buddhist schools, the largest collections are from the Theravāda and Sarvāstivāda schools, but there are also full texts and fragments from the Dharmaguptaka, Mahāsāṅghika, Mahīśāsaka, Mūlasarvāstivāda, and others. The most widely studied early Buddhist material are the first four Pāli Nikayas, as well as the corresponding Chinese Āgamas. The modern study of early pre-sectarian Buddhism often relies on comparative scholarship using these various early Buddhist sources.

Various scholars of Buddhist studies such as Richard Gombrich, Akira Hirakawa, Alexander Wynne, and A. K. Warder hold that early Buddhist texts contain material that could possibly be traced to the historical Buddha himself or at least to the early years of pre-sectarian Buddhism. In Mahāyāna Buddhism, these texts are sometimes referred to as "Hinayana" or "Śrāvakayāna".

Although many versions of the texts of the early Buddhist schools exist, the only complete collection of texts to survive in a Middle Indo-Aryan language is the Tipiṭaka (triple basket) of the Theravāda school. The other (parts of) extant versions of the Tripitakas of early schools include the Chinese Āgamas, which includes collections by the Sarvāstivāda and the Dharmaguptaka. The Chinese Buddhist canon contains a complete collection of early sutras in Chinese translation, their content is very similar to the Pali, differing in detail but not in the core doctrinal content. The Tibetan canon contains some of these early texts as well, but not as complete collections. The earliest known Buddhist manuscripts containing early Buddhist texts are the Gandharan Buddhist Texts, dated to the 1st century BCE and constitute the Buddhist textual tradition of Gandharan Buddhism which was an important link between Indian and East Asian Buddhism. Parts of what is likely to be the canon of the Dharmaguptaka can be found among these Gandharan Buddhist Texts.

There are different genres of early Buddhist texts, including prose "suttas" (Sanskrit: sūtra, discourses), disciplinary works (Vinaya), various forms of verse compositions (such as gāthā and udāna), mixed prose and verse works (geya), and also lists (matika) of monastic rules or doctrinal topics. A large portion of Early Buddhist literature is part of the "sutta" or "sutra" genre. The Sūtras (Sanskrit; Pāli: Sutta) are mostly discourses attributed to the Buddha or one of his close disciples. They are considered to be buddhavacana by all schools. The Buddha's discourses were perhaps originally organised according to the style in which they were delivered. They were later organized into collections called Nikāyas ('volumes') or Āgamas ('scriptures'), which were further collected into the Sūtra Piṭaka ("Basket of Discourses") of the canons of the early Buddhist schools.

Most of the early sutras that have survived are from Sthavira nikaya schools, no complete collection has survived from the other early branch of Buddhism, the Mahāsāṃghika. However, some individual texts have survived, such as the Śālistamba Sūtra (rice stalk sūtra). This sūtra contains many parallel passages to the Pali suttas. As noted by N. Ross Reat, this text is in general agreement with the basic doctrines of the early sutras of the Sthavira schools such as dependent origination, the "middle way" between eternalism and annihilationism, the "five aggregates", the "three unwholesome roots", the Four Noble Truths and the Noble Eightfold Path. Another important source for Mahāsāṃghika sutras is the Mahāvastu ("Great Event"), which is a collection of various texts compiled into a biography of the Buddha. Within it can be found quotations and whole sutras, such as the Mahāsāṃghika version of the Dharmacakrapravartana.

The other major type of text aside from the sutras are the Vinayas. Vinaya literature is primarily concerned with aspects of the monastic discipline and the rules and procedures that govern the Buddhist monastic community (sangha). However, Vinaya as a term is also contrasted with Dharma, where the pair (Dhamma-Vinaya) mean something like 'doctrine and discipline'. The Vinaya literature in fact contains a considerable range of texts. There are, of course, those that discuss the monastic rules, how they came about, how they developed, and how they were applied. But the vinaya also contains some doctrinal expositions, ritual and liturgical texts, biographical stories, and some elements of the "Jatakas", or birth stories. Various Vinaya collections survive in full, including those of the following schools: Theravāda (in Pali), Mula-Sarvāstivāda (in Tibetan translation) and the Mahāsānghika, Sarvāstivāda, Mahīshāsika, and Dharmaguptaka (in Chinese translations). In addition, portions survive of a number of Vinayas in various languages.

Aside from the Sutras and the Vinayas, some schools also had collections of "minor" or miscellaneous texts. The Theravāda Khuddaka Nikāya ('Minor Collection') is one example of such a collection, while there is evidence that the Dharmaguptaka school had a similar collection, known as the Kṣudraka Āgama. Fragments of the Dharmaguptaka minor collection have been found in Gandhari. The Sarvāstivāda school also seems to have had a Kṣudraka collection of texts, but they did not see it as an "Āgama". These "minor" collections seem to have been a category for miscellaneous texts, and was perhaps never definitively established among many early Buddhist schools.

Early Buddhist texts which appear in such "minor" collections include:

- The Dharmapadas. These texts are collections of sayings and aphorisms, the most well known of which is the Pali Dhammapada, but there are various versions in different languages, such as the Patna Dharmapada and the Gāndhārī Dharmapada.
- The Pali Udana and the Sarvāstivāda Udānavarga. These are other collections of "inspired sayings".
- The Pali Itivuttaka ("as it was said") and the Chinese translation of the Itivṛttaka (本事經) by Xuanzang.
- The Pali Sutta Nipata, including texts such as the Aṭṭhakavagga and Pārāyanavagga. There is also a parallel in the Chinese translation of the Arthavargīya.
- Theragāthā and Therīgāthā two collections of verses related to the elder disciples of the Buddha. A Sanskrit Sthaviragāthā is also known to have existed.

=== Abhidharma texts ===
Abhidharma (in Pāli, Abhidhamma) texts which contain "an abstract and highly technical systematization" of doctrinal material appearing in the Buddhist sutras. It is an attempt to best express the Buddhist view of "ultimate reality" (paramartha-satya) without using the conventional language and narrative stories found in the sutras. The prominent modern scholar of Abhidharma, Erich Frauwallner has said that these Buddhist systems are "among the major achievements of the classical period of Indian philosophy." Modern scholars generally believe that the canonical Abhidharma texts emerged after the time of the Buddha, in around the 3rd century BCE. Therefore, the canonical Abhidharma works are generally claimed by scholars not to represent the words of the Buddha himself, but those of later Buddhists.

There are different types and historical layers of Abhidharma literature. The early canonical Abhidharma works (like the Abhidhamma Pitaka) are not philosophical treatises, but mainly summaries and expositions of early doctrinal lists with their accompanying explanations. These texts developed out of early Buddhist lists or matrices (mātṛkās) of key teachings, such as the 37 factors leading to Awakening. Scholars like Erich Frauwallner have argued that there is an "ancient core" of early pre-sectarian material in the earliest Abhidharma works, such as in the Theravada Vibhanga, the Dharmaskandha of the Sarvastivada, and the Śāriputrābhidharma of the Dharmaguptaka school.

Only two full canonical Abhidharma collections have survived both containing seven texts, the Theravāda Abhidhamma and the Sarvastivada Abhidharma, which survives in Chinese translation. However, texts of other tradition have survived, such as the Śāriputrābhidharma of the Dharmaguptaka school, the Tattvasiddhi Śāstra (Chéngshílun), and various Abhidharma type works from the Pudgalavada school.

Later post-canonical Abhidharma works were written as either large treatises (śāstra), as commentaries (aṭṭhakathā) or as smaller introductory manuals. They are more developed philosophical works which include many innovations and doctrines not found in the canonical Abhidharma.

=== Other texts ===
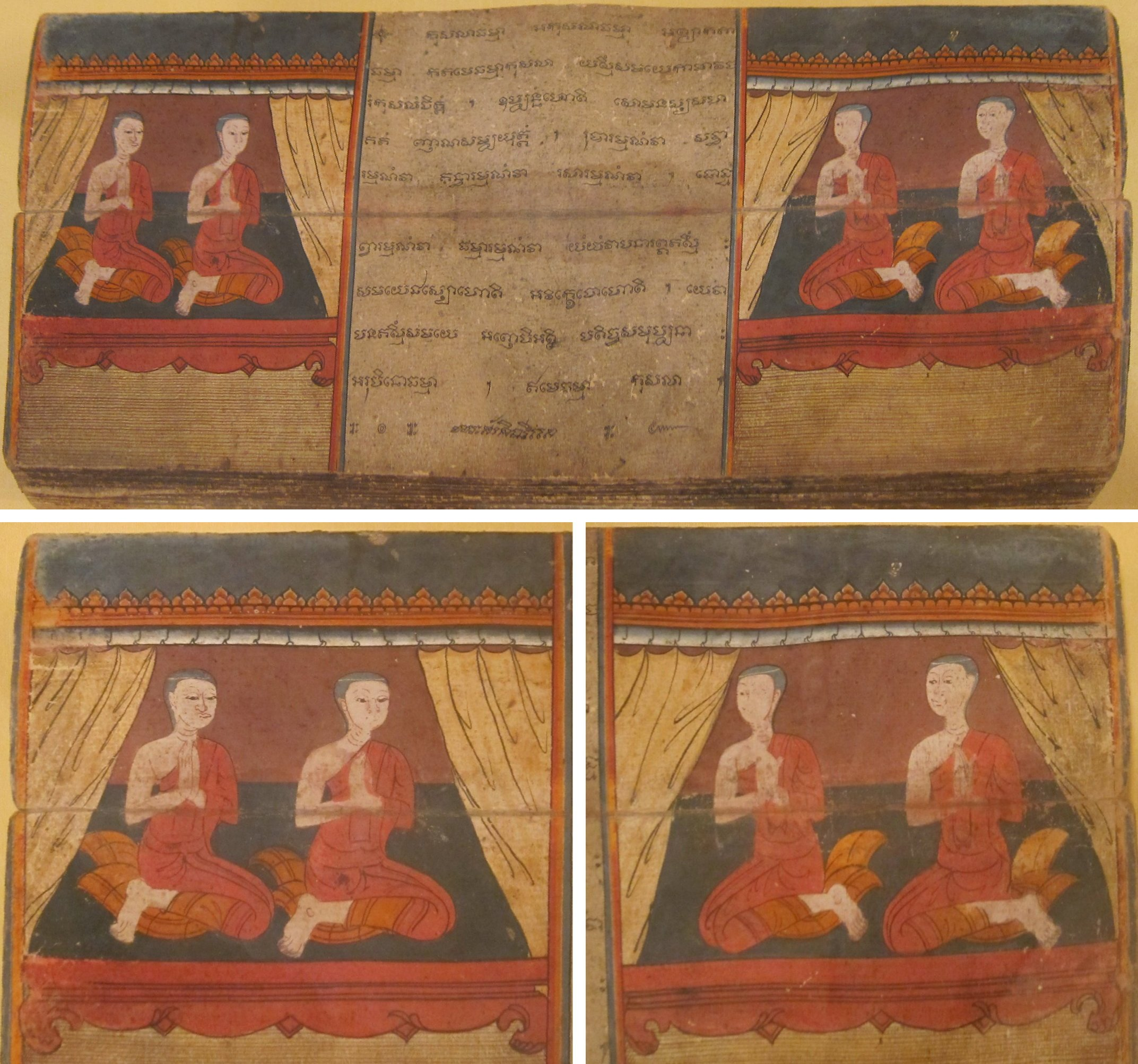
Illuminated manuscript of a Jataka, the Story of Phra Malai's Visit to Heaven and Hell, Thailand, Bangkok style, 1813, ink, color and gold on paper, Honolulu Museum of Art

The early Buddhist schools also preserved other types of texts which developed in later periods, which were variously seen as canonical or not, depending on the tradition.

One of the largest category of texts that were neither Sutra, Vinaya nor Abhidharma includes various collections of stories such as the Jātaka tales and the Avadānas (Pali: Apadāna). These are moral fables and legends dealing with the previous births of Gautama Buddha in both human and animal form. The different Buddhist schools had their own collections of these tales and often disagreed on which stories were canonical.

Another genre that developed over time in the various early schools were biographies of the Buddha. Buddha biographies include the Mahāvastu of the Lokottaravadin school, the northern tradition's Lalitavistara Sūtra, the Theravada Nidānakathā and the Dharmaguptaka Abhiniṣkramaṇa Sūtra.

One of the most famous of biographies is the Buddhacarita, an epic poem in Classical Sanskrit by Aśvaghoṣa. Aśvaghoṣa also wrote other poems, as well as Sanskrit dramas. Another Sanskrit Buddhist poet was Mātṛceṭa, who composed various pious hymns in slokas. Buddhist poetry is a broad genre with numerous forms and has been composed in many languages, including Sanskrit, Tibetan, Chinese and Japanese. Aside from the work of Aśvaghoṣa, another important Sanskrit poet was Mātr̥ceṭa, known for his One Hundred and Fifty Verses. Buddhist poetry was also written in popular Indian languages, such as Tamil and Apabhramsa. One well known poem is the Tamil epic Manimekalai, which is one of the Five Great Epics of Tamil literature.

Other later hagiographical texts include the Buddhavaṃsa, the Cariyāpiṭaka and the Vimanavatthu (as well as its Chinese parallel, the Vimānāvadāna).

There are also some unique individual texts like the Milinda pañha (literally The Questions of Milinda) and its parallel in Chinese, the Nāgasena Bhikśu Sūtra (那先比丘經). These texts depict a dialogue between the monk Nagasena, and the Indo-Greek King Menander (Pali: Milinda). It is a compendium of doctrine, and covers a range of subjects.

== Theravāda texts ==
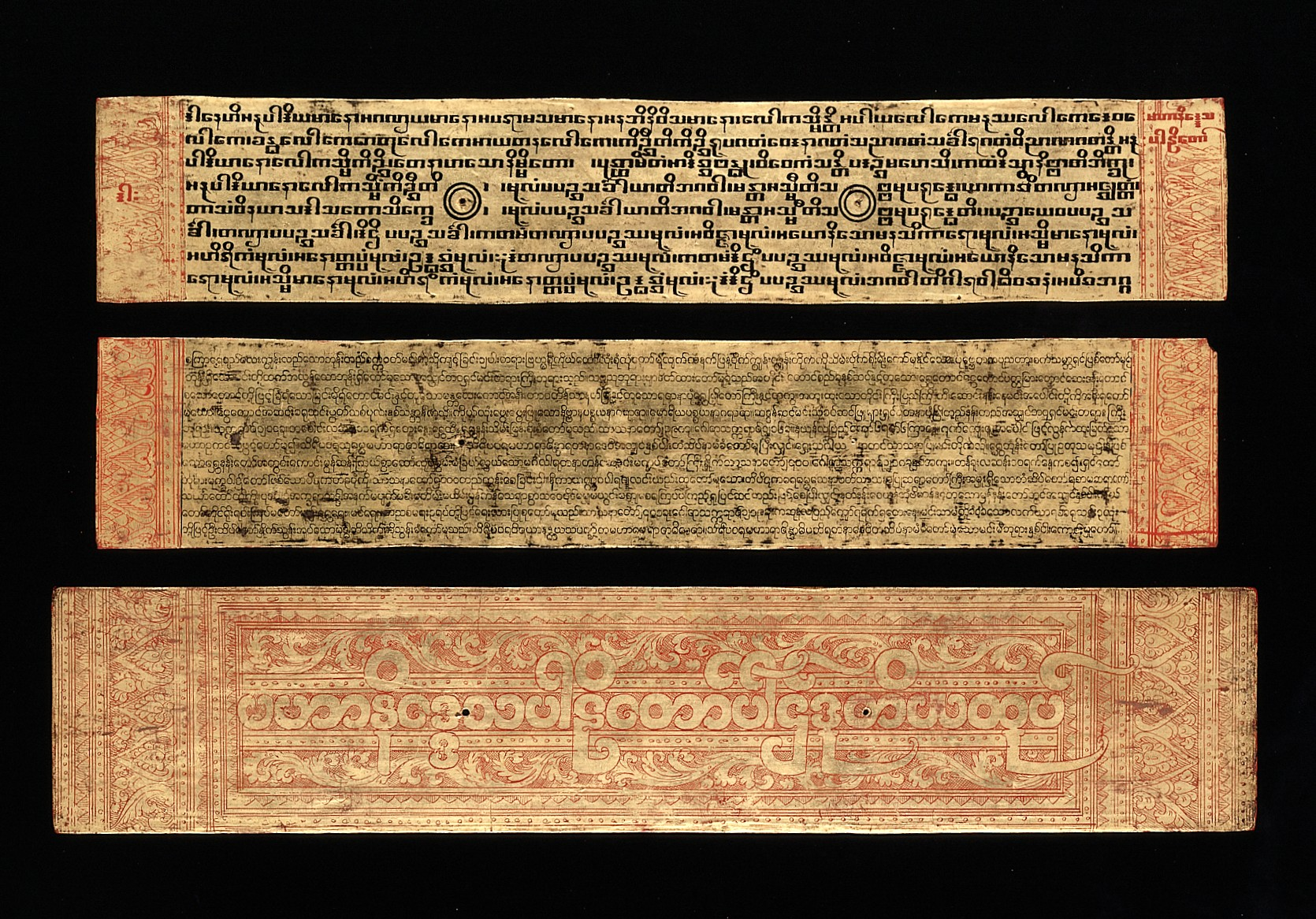
Burmese-Pali manuscript copy of the Buddhist text Mahaniddesa, showing three different types of Burmese script, (top) medium square, (centre) round, and (bottom) outline round in red lacquer from the inside of one of the gilded covers

The Theravāda tradition has an extensive commentarial literature, much of which is still untranslated. These are attributed to scholars working in Sri Lanka such as Buddhaghosa (5th century CE) and Dhammapala. There are also sub-commentaries (ṭīkā) or commentaries on the commentaries. Buddhaghosa was also the author of the Visuddhimagga, or Path of Purification, which is a manual of doctrine and practice according to the Mahavihara tradition of Sri Lanka. According to Nanamoli Bhikkhu, this text is regarded as "the principal non-canonical authority of the Theravada." A similar albeit shorter work is the Vimuttimagga. Another highly influential Pali Theravada work is the Abhidhammattha-sangaha (11th or 12th century), a short 50 page introductory summary to the Abhidhamma, which is widely used to teach Abhidhamma.

Buddhaghosa is known to have worked from Buddhist commentaries in the Sri Lankan Sinhala language, which are now lost. Sri Lankan literature in the vernacular contains many Buddhist works, including as classical Sinhala poems such as the Muvadevāvata (The Story of the Bodhisattva's Birth as King Mukhadeva, 12th century) and the Sasadāvata (The Story of the Bodhisattva's Birth as a Hare, 12th century) as well as prose works like the Dhampiyātuvā gätapadaya (Commentary on the Blessed Doctrine), a commentary on words and phrases in the Pāli Dhammapada.

The Theravāda textual tradition spread into Burma and Thailand where Pali scholarship continued to flourish with such works as the Aggavamsa of Saddaniti and the Jinakalamali of Ratanapañña. Pali literature continued to be composed into the modern era, especially in Burma, and writers such as Mahasi Sayadaw translated some of their texts into Pali.

There are also numerous Esoteric Theravada texts, mostly from Southeast Asia. This tradition flourished in Cambodia and Thailand before the 19th century reformist movement of Rama IV. One of these texts has been published in English by the Pali Text Society as "Manual of a Mystic".

Burmese Buddhist literature developed unique poetic forms from the 1450s onwards, a major type of poetry is the pyui' which are long and embellished translations of Pali Buddhist works, mainly jatakas. A famous example of pyui' poetry is the Kui khan pyui' (the pyui' in nine sections, 1523). There is also a genre of Burmese commentaries or nissayas which were used to teach Pali. The nineteenth century saw a flowering of Burmese Buddhist literature in various genres including religious biography, Abhidharma, legal literature and meditation literature.

An influential text of Thai literature is the "Three Worlds According to King Ruang" (1345) by Phya Lithai, which is an extensive Cosmological and visionary survey of the Thai Buddhist universe.

== Mahāyāna texts ==
=== Mahāyāna sūtras ===
See Mahāyāna sūtras for historical background and a list of some sutras categorised by source.

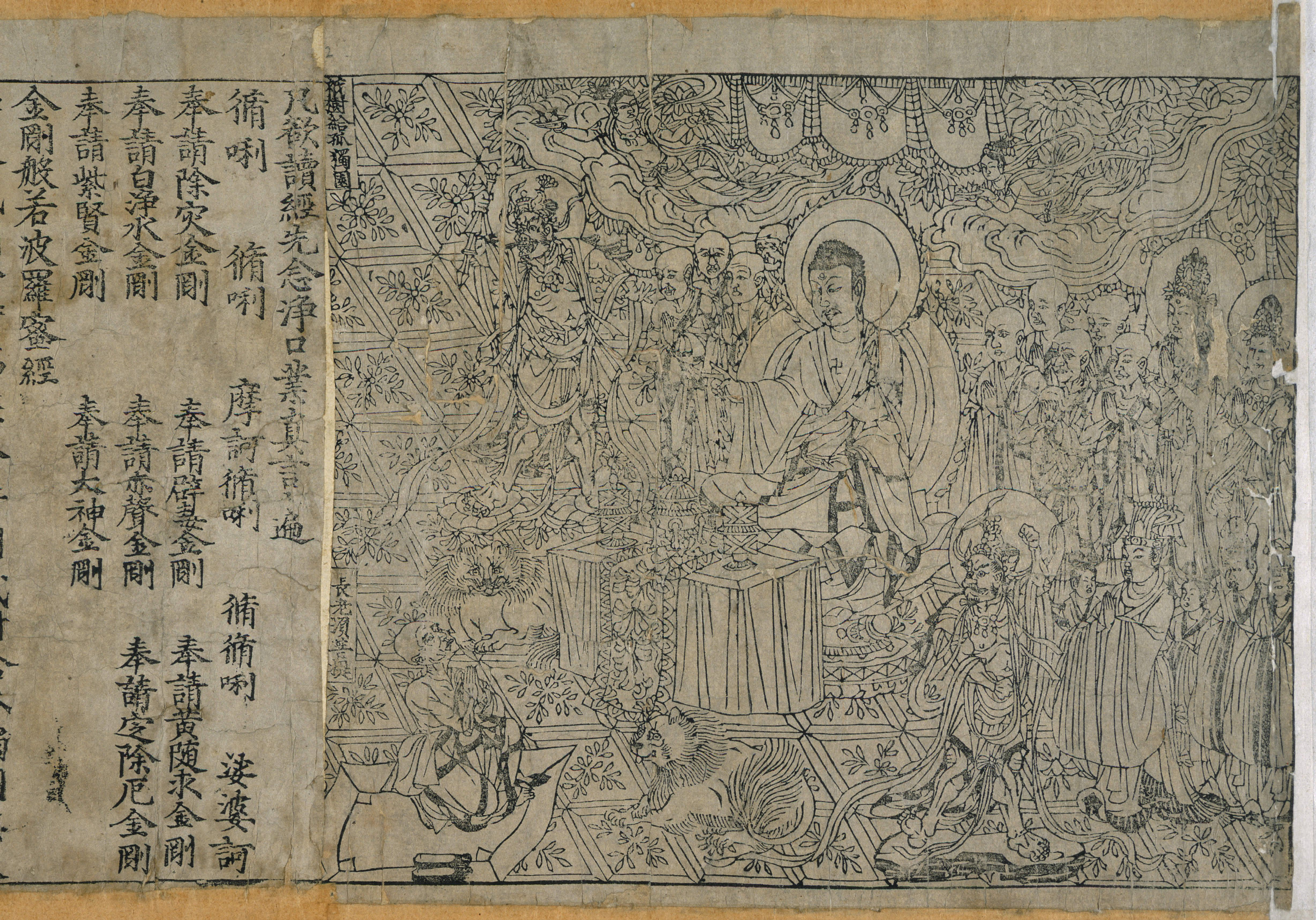
Frontispiece of the Chinese Diamond Sūtra, the oldest known dated printed book in the world

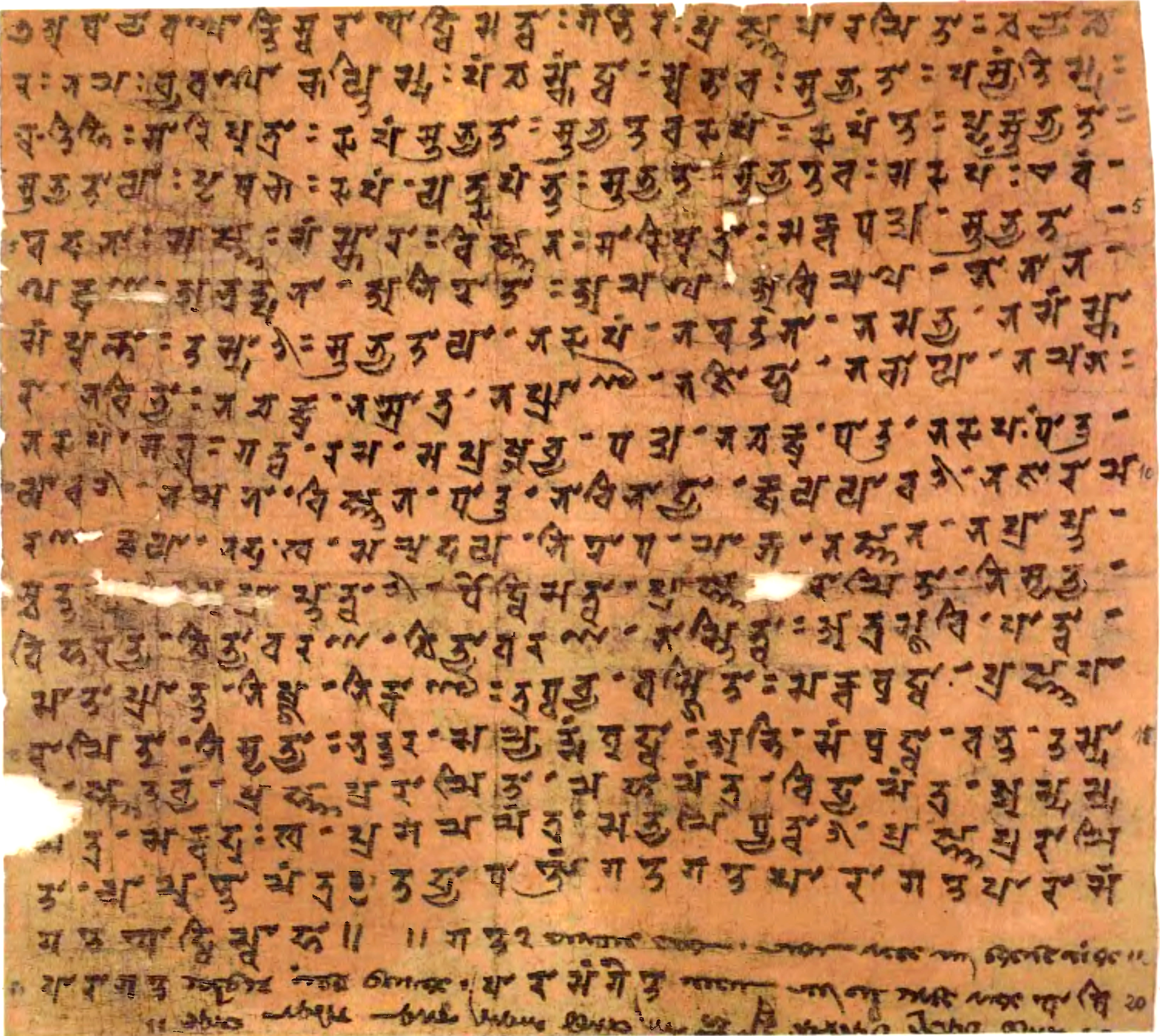
Sanskrit manuscript of the Heart Sūtra, written in the Siddhaṃ script. Bibliothèque nationale de France

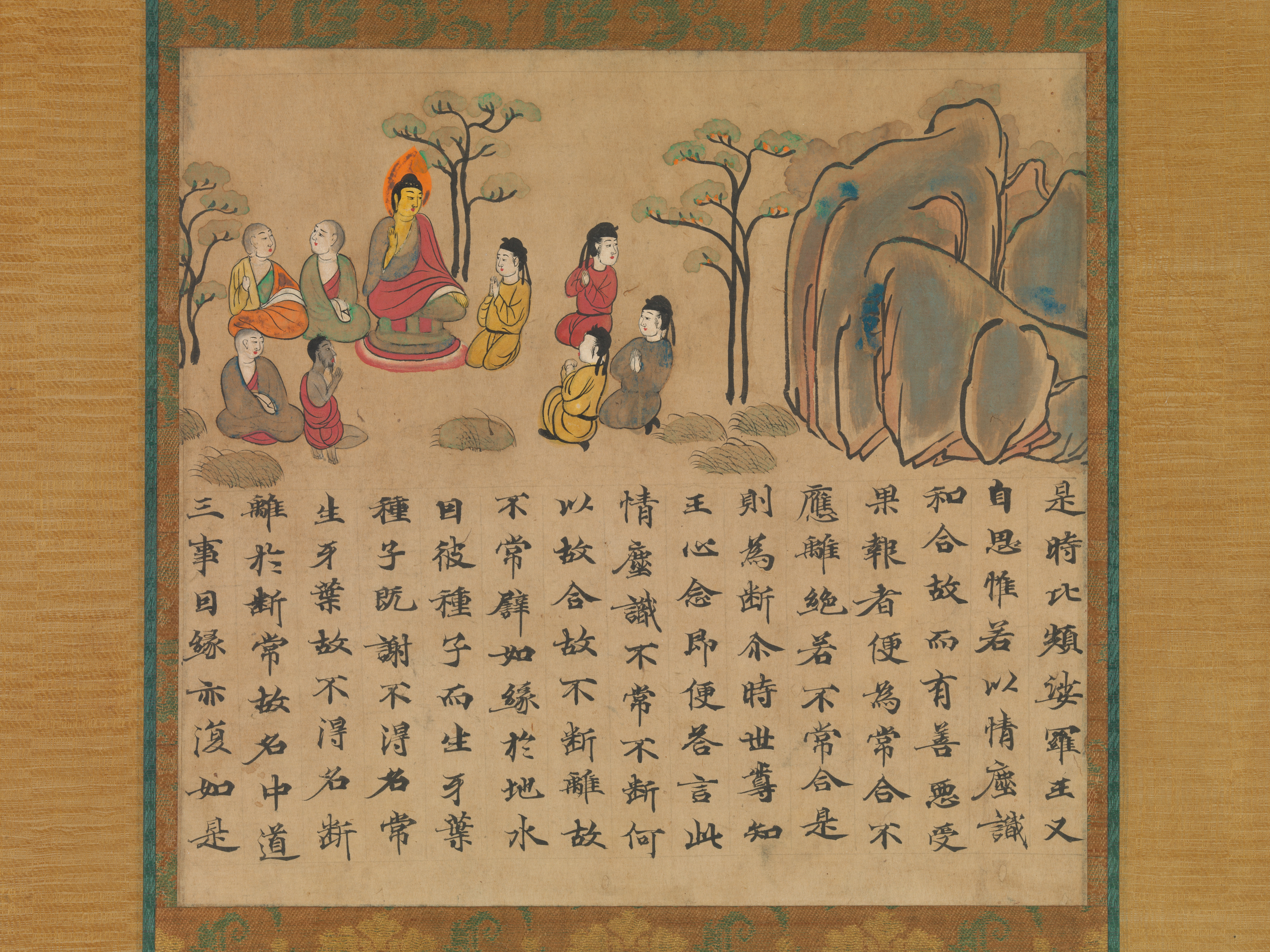
A section from the Illustrated Sutra of Past and Present Karma (Kako genzai inga kyō emaki), mid-8th century, Japan

Around the beginning of the common era, a new genre of sutra literature began to be written with a focus on the Bodhisattva ideal, commonly known as Mahāyāna ("Great Vehicle") or Bodhisattvayāna ("Bodhisattva Vehicle"). The earliest of these sutras do not call themselves 'Mahāyāna,' but use the terms Vaipulya (extensive, expansive) sutras, or Gambhira (deep, profound) sutras.

There are various theories of how Mahāyāna emerged. According to David Drewes, it seems to have been "primarily a textual movement, focused on the revelation, preaching, and dissemination of Mahāyāna sutras, that developed within, and never really departed from, traditional Buddhist social and institutional structures." Early dharmabhāṇakas (preachers, reciters of these sutras) were influential figures, and promoted these new texts throughout the Buddhist communities.

Many of these Mahāyāna sūtras were written in Sanskrit (in hybrid forms and in classical Sanskrit) and then later translated into the Tibetan and Chinese Buddhist canons (the Kangyur and the Taishō Tripiṭaka respectively) which then developed their own textual histories. Sanskrit had been adopted by Buddhists in north India during the Kushan era and Sanskrit Buddhist literature became the dominant tradition in Buddhist India until the decline of Buddhism there.

Mahāyāna sūtras are also generally regarded by the Mahāyāna tradition as being more profound than the śrāvaka texts as well as generating more spiritual merit and benefit. Thus, they are seen as superior and more virtuous to non-Mahāyāna sutras. The Mahāyāna sūtras are traditionally considered by Mahāyāna Buddhists to be the word of the Buddha. Mahāyāna Buddhists explained the emergence of these new texts by arguing that they had been transmitted in secret, via lineages of supernatural beings (such as the nagas) until people were ready to hear them, or by stating that they had been revealed directly through visions and meditative experiences to a select few.

According to David McMahan, the literary style of the Mahāyāna sūtras reveals how these texts were mainly composed as written works and how they also needed to legitimate themselves to other Buddhists. They used different literary and narrative ways to defend the legitimacy of these texts as Buddha word. Mahāyāna sūtras such as the Gaṇḍavyūha also often criticize early Buddhist figures, such as Sariputra for lacking knowledge and goodness, and thus, these elders or śrāvaka are seen as not intelligent enough to receive the Mahāyāna teachings, while more the advanced elite, the bodhisattvas, are depicted as those who can see the highest teachings.

These sūtras were not recognized as being Buddha word by various early Buddhist schools and there was lively debate over their authenticity throughout the Buddhist world. Various Mahāyāna sūtras warn against the charge that they are not word of the Buddha, showing that they are aware of this claim. Buddhist communities such as the Mahāsāṃghika school were divided along these doctrinal lines into sub-schools which accepted or did not accept these texts. The Theravāda school of Sri Lanka also was split on the issue during the medieval period. The Mahavihara sub-sect rejected these texts and the (now extinct) Abhayagiri sect accepted them. Theravāda commentaries mention these texts (which they call Vedalla/Vetulla) as not being the Buddha word and being counterfeit scriptures. Modern Theravāda generally does not accept these texts as buddhavacana (word of the Buddha).

The Mahāyāna movement remained quite small until the fifth century, with very few manuscripts having been found before then (the exceptions are from Bamiyan). However, according to Walser, the fifth and sixth centuries saw a great increase in the production of these texts. By this time, Chinese pilgrims, such as Faxian, Yijing, and Xuanzang were traveling to India, and their writings do describe monasteries which they label 'Mahāyāna' as well as monasteries where both Mahāyāna monks and non-Mahāyāna monks lived together.

Mahāyāna sūtras contain several elements besides the promotion of the bodhisattva ideal, including "expanded cosmologies and mythical histories, ideas of purelands and great, 'celestial' Buddhas and bodhisattvas, descriptions of powerful new religious practices, new ideas on the nature of the Buddha, and a range of new philosophical perspectives." These texts present stories of revelation in which the Buddha teaches Mahāyāna sutras to certain bodhisattvas who vow to teach and spread these sutras. These texts also promoted new religious practices that were supposed to make Buddhahood easy to achieve, such as "hearing the names of certain Buddhas or bodhisattvas, maintaining Buddhist precepts, and listening to, memorizing, and copying sutras." Some Mahāyāna sūtras claim that these practices lead to rebirth in Pure lands such as Abhirati and Sukhavati, where becoming a Buddha is much easier to achieve.

Several Mahāyāna sūtras also depict important Buddhas or Bodhisattvas not found in earlier texts, such as the Buddhas Amitabha, Akshobhya and Vairocana, and the bodhisattvas Maitreya, Mañjusri, Ksitigarbha, and Avalokiteshvara. An important feature of Mahāyāna is the way that it understands the nature of Buddhahood. Mahāyāna texts see Buddhas (and to a lesser extent, certain bodhisattvas as well) as transcendental or supramundane (lokuttara) beings, who live for eons constantly helping others through their activity.

According to Paul Williams, in Mahāyāna, a Buddha is often seen as "a spiritual king, relating to and caring for the world", rather than simply a teacher who after his death "has completely 'gone beyond' the world and its cares". Buddha Sakyamuni's life and death on earth is then usually understood as a "mere appearance", his death is an unreal show, in reality he continues to live in a transcendent reality. Thus the Buddha in the Lotus sutra says that he is "the father of the world", "the self existent (svayambhu)...protector of all creatures", who has "never ceased to exist" and only "pretends to have passed away."

Hundreds of Mahāyāna sūtras have survived in Sanskrit, Chinese and Tibetan translation. There many different genres or classes of Mahāyāna sutras, such as the Prajñāpāramitā sūtras, the Tathāgatagarbha sūtras and the Pure Land sūtras. The different Mahāyāna schools have many varied classification schemas for organizing them and they see different texts as having higher authority than others.

Some Mahāyāna sūtras are also thought to display a distinctly tantric character, like some of the shorter Perfection of Wisdom sutras and the Mahavairocana Sutra. At least some editions of the Kangyur include the Heart Sutra in the tantra division. Such overlap is not confined to "neighbouring" yanas: at least nine "Sravakayana" texts can be found in the tantra divisions of some editions of the Kangyur. One of them, the Atanatiya Sutra, is also included in the Mikkyo (esoteric) division of the standard modern collected edition of Sino-Japanese Buddhist literature. Some Mahāyāna texts also contain dhāraṇī, which are chants that are believed to have magical and spiritual power.

=== Major Mahāyāna sūtras ===
The following is a list of some well known Mahāyāna sutras which have been studied by modern scholarship:

- Ajitasena Sutra – A "proto-Mahāyāna" text, possibly one of the earliest texts with Mahāyāna elements.
- Ugraparipṛcchā Sūtra – An early Mahāyāna text focused on bodhisattva monasticism.
- Aṣṭasāhasrikā Prajñāpāramitā Sūtra – Possibly the earliest Prajñāpāramitā text.
- Vajracchedikā Prajñāpāramitā (Diamond Sutra) – Another possibly early Prajñāpāramitā text, very popular.
- Prajñāpāramitāhṛdaya (Heart Sutra) – Another very popular Prajñāpāramitā text.
- Longer Sukhāvatīvyūha Sūtra (Infinite Life Sutra) – An influential text in Pure Land Buddhism.
- Amitabha Sutra – Another Pure land text.
- Contemplation Sutra – Another Pure land text.
- Pratyutpanna Sutra.
- Shurangama Samadhi Sutra.
- Saddharmapundarīka-sūtra (Lotus Sutra) – One of the most influential texts in East Asian Buddhism.
- Mahāratnakūta Sūtra – Actually a collection of various sūtras.
- Suvarnaprabhasa Sutra (or Golden Light Sutra).
- Avataṃsaka Sūtra – A compilation of numerous texts, such as the Gaṇḍavyūha Sutra and the Daśabhūmika Sūtra.
- Sandhinirmocana Sutra (c. 2nd century CE), the main sutra of Yogacara Buddhism, introduces the doctrine of the "three turnings".
- Tathāgatagarbha Sūtra – One of the key "Buddha nature" (Tathāgatagarbha) sūtras.
- Shrīmālādevi-simhanāda Sūtra – A "Buddha nature" text.
- Mahayana Mahaparinirvana Sutra – A "Buddha nature" text, very influential in East Asian Buddhism.
- Laṅkāvatāra Sūtra – Includes Yogacara and Tathāgatagarbha elements, influential in Zen Buddhism.
- Samādhirāja Sūtra (or Candrapradīpa Sūtra), influential in the Madhyamaka scholasticism of Tibet.
- Vimalakīrti Sūtra – A sutra which depicts the teachings of a layman on non-dualism.
- Brahmajāla Sūtra – A text which contains an influential listing of bodhisattva precepts.
- Kāraṇḍavyūhasūtra, which introduces the Om Mani Padme Hum mantra.
- Uṣṇīṣa Vijaya Dhāraṇī Sūtra.

=== Indian treatises ===
The Mahāyāna commentarial and exegetical literature is vast. Many of these exegetical and scholastic works are called Śāstras, which can refer to a scholastic treatise, exposition or commentary.

Central to much of Mahāyāna philosophy are the works of the Indian scholar Nagarjuna. Especially important is his magnum opus, the Mūlamadhyamika-karikā, or Root Verses on the Middle Way, a seminal text on the Madhyamika philosophy. Various other authors of the Madhyamaka school followed him and wrote commentaries to his texts or their own treatises.

Another very influential work which traditionally attributed to Nagarjuna In East Asia is the Dà zhìdù lùn (*Mahāprajñāpāramitopadeśa, The Great Discourse on Prajñāpāramitā). This is a massive Mahayana Buddhist treatise and commentary on the Prajñāpāramitā sutra in Twenty-five Thousand Lines, and it has been extremely important in the development of the major Chinese Buddhist traditions. Its authorship to Nagarjuna however has been questioned by modern scholars and it only survives in the Chinese translation by Kumārajīva (344–413 CE).

The Yogācārabhūmi-Śāstra (fourth century CE) is another very large treatise which focuses on yogic praxis and the doctrines of the Indian Yogacara school. Unlike the Dà zhìdù lùn, it was studied and transmitted in both the East Asian Buddhist and the Tibetan Buddhist traditions.

The works of Asanga, a great scholar and systematizer of the Yogacara, are also very influential in both traditions, including his magnum opus, the Mahāyāna-samgraha, and the Abhidharma-samuccaya (a compendium of Abhidharma thought that became the standard text for many Mahayana schools especially in Tibet). Various texts are also said to have received by Asanga from the Bodhisattva Maitreya in the Tushita god realm, including works such as Madhyāntavibhāga, the Mahāyāna-sūtrālamkāra, and the Abhisamayālamkara. Their authorship remains disputed by modern scholars however. Asanga's brother Vasubandhu wrote a large number of texts associated with the Yogacara including: Trisvabhāva-nirdesa, Vimsatika, Trimsika, and the Abhidharmakośa-bhāsya. Numerous commentaries were written by later Yogacara exegetes on the works of these two brothers.

The 9th Century Indian Buddhist Shantideva produced two texts: the Bodhicaryāvatāra has been a strong influence in many schools of the Mahayana. It is notably a favorite text of the 14th Dalai Lama.

Dignāga is associated with a school of Buddhist logic that tried to establish which texts were valid sources of knowledge (see also Epistemology). He produced the Pramāna-samuccaya, and later Dharmakirti wrote the Pramāna-vārttikā, which was a commentary and reworking of the Dignaga text.

=== East Asian works ===
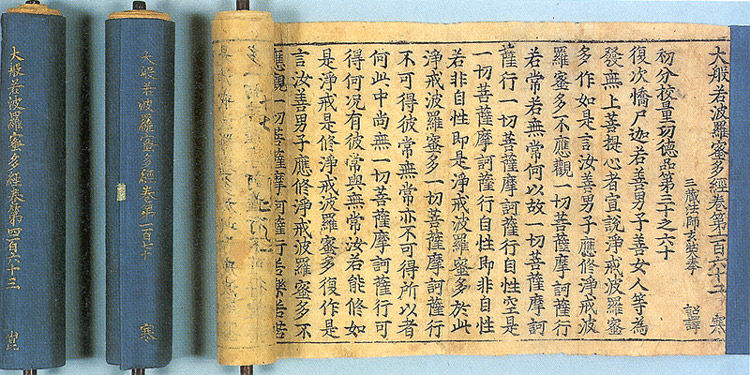
A scroll from a copy of the Great Perfection of Wisdom Sutra, a print from the First Tripitaka Koreana Edition, National Treasure of the Republic of Korea No. 284

The early period of the development of Chinese Buddhism was concerned with the collection and translation of texts into Chinese and the creation of the Chinese Buddhist canon. The language of these texts is termed Buddhist Chinese, and it differs significantly from Classical Chinese. Buddhist Chinese includes much new terminology created specifically for translating Indic sources, and it also draws on vernacular Chinese words and phrases not found in Classical Chinese. Many of these Buddhist Chinese translations were done by Indian or Central Asian monks who traveled to China and worked with Chinese Buddhists in translation teams. Others were completed by Chinese Buddhists who learned the source languages. This was often done by traveling to India, as with the examples of Xuanzang (c. 602–664) and Yijing (635–713 CE). Xuanzang's journey is recorded in the Great Tang Records on the Western Regions. He also wrote a commentary on Yogacara which remained influential, the Discourse on the Perfection of Consciousness-only.

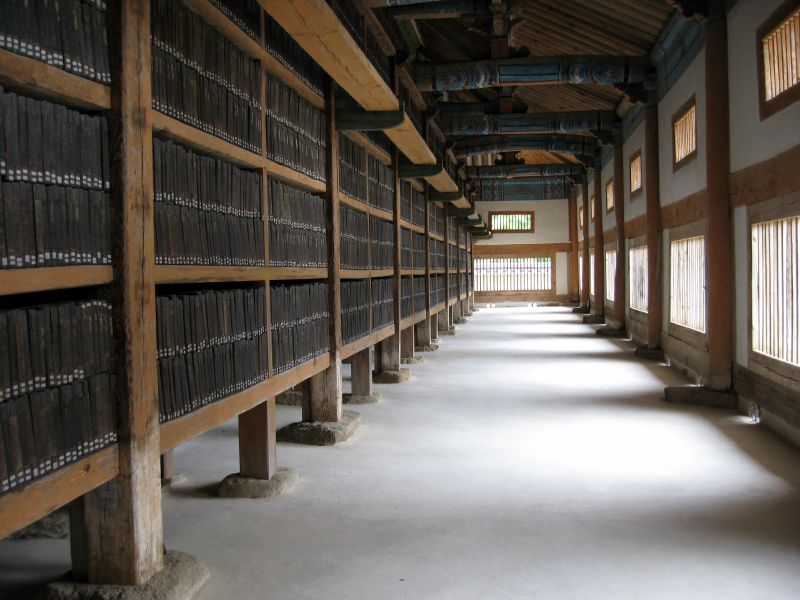
Wooden printing blocks of the Tripiṭaka Koreana, an early edition of the Chinese Buddhist canon, stored at Haeinsa temple, South Korea.

There are nunmerous editions of the Chinese Buddhist Canon, which is the main canonical collection used in East Asian Buddhism. The Tripitaka Koreana, which was crafted in two versions (the first one was destroyed by fire during the Mongol invasions of Korea), is a Korean collection of the Tripitaka carved onto 81,258 wooden printing blocks during the 13th century. Still intact in good condition after some 750 years, it has been described by the UNESCO committee as "one of the most important and most complete corpus of Buddhist doctrinal texts in the world".

The Chinese Buddhist canon contains numerous genres of scriptures, apart from the Mahayana Sutras and translations of Indian shastra literature. Some of these translations may have been heavily edited, expanded or even composed in Central Asia or China. These include the Dhyāna sutras (Chan-jing), a group of early Buddhist meditation texts which contain teachings from Kashmiri meditation masters along with some early proto-Mahayana meditations. The Awakening of Faith in the Mahayana (Dàshéng Qǐxìn Lùn) is another influential text in East Asian Buddhism, especially for the Huayan, and its Japanese equivalent, Kegon. While it is traditionally attributed to Ashvaghosha, most scholars now hold it is a Chinese composition. Another very influential commentary in the Chinese tradition is the Great Perfection of Wisdom Treatise (Dazhidulun), translated by Kuchean translator Kumārajīva (344-413) and attributed to Nagarjuna. Modern scholars are unsure of the provenance of this text, with some arguing that much of the text may have been composed or at the very least heavily edited in China.

During the Liu Song (420–479) and the Tang era (618–907), East Asian Buddhism began to develop its own unique doctrinal literature. This begins with the rise of homegrown Chinese traditions like the Tiantai School and its major representative, Zhiyi (538–597 CE), who is known for his commentaries on the Lotus sutra, as well as the first major comprehensive work on meditation composed in China, the Mohe Zhiguan (摩訶止観). Another important school of Chinese Buddhism is Huayan, which focused on developing their philosophical texts from the Avatamsaka Sutra (Ch: Huayan-jing). An important patriarch of this school is Fazang (643–712) who wrote many commentaries and treatises. Another influential Chinese Buddhist figure during the Tang is Shandao (613–681), who is considered to be the de facto founder of Pure Land Buddhism.

Zen Buddhism developed a large literary tradition based on the teachings and sayings of Chinese Zen masters. One of the key texts in this genre is the Platform Sutra attributed to Zen patriarch Huineng, it gives an autobiographical account of his succession as Ch'an Patriarch, as well as teachings about Ch'an theory and practice. The earliest versions of this central Chan work date to the 9th century CE. Other influential Chan texts are Koan collections, which are compilations of the sayings of Chinese masters such as the Blue Cliff Record and The Gateless Gate. Another key genre is that of compilations of Zen master biographies, such as the Transmission of the Lamp. Buddhist poetry was also an important contribution to the literature of the tradition.

After the arrival of Chinese Buddhism in Japan, Korea and Vietnam; they developed their own traditions and literature in the local language.

== Vajrayana texts ==
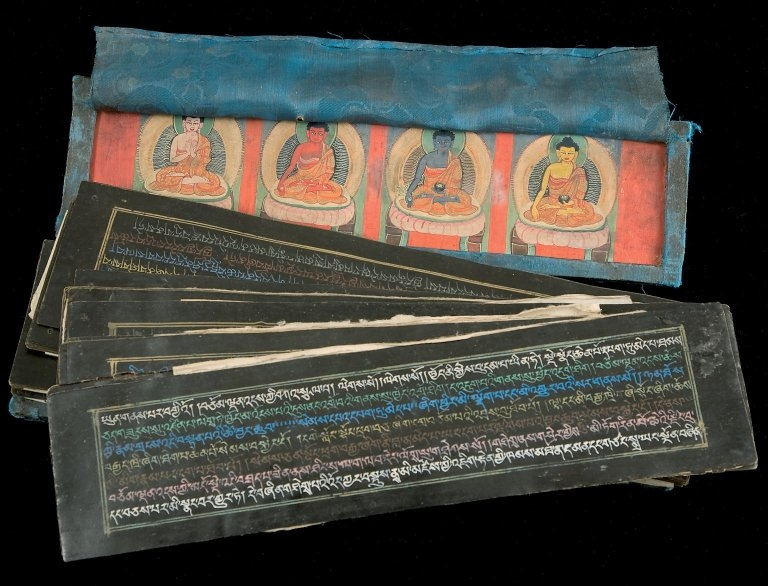
Image of leaves and the upper book cover of Thar pa chen po'i mod (The Sūtra of Great Liberation), showing Tibetan writings on black paper with an ink that contain gold, silver, copper, coral, lazurite, malachite, and mother of pearl. The unbound sheets are kept between two wooden boards covered with green brocade. The upper book cover shows the images of four of the Eight Medicine Buddhas.

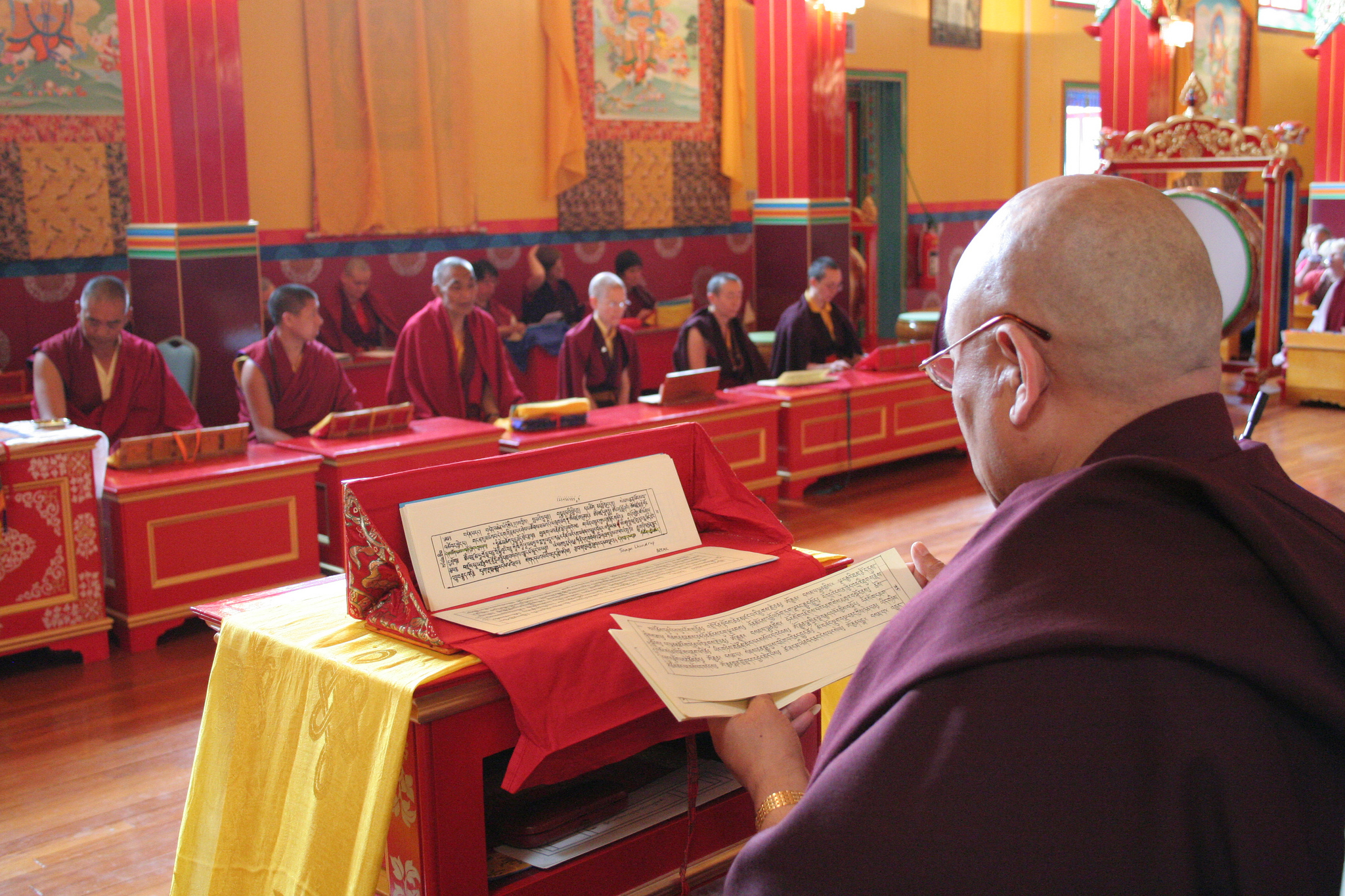
Lama Yeshe Losal Rinpoche of Samye Ling Temple reads from prayer text

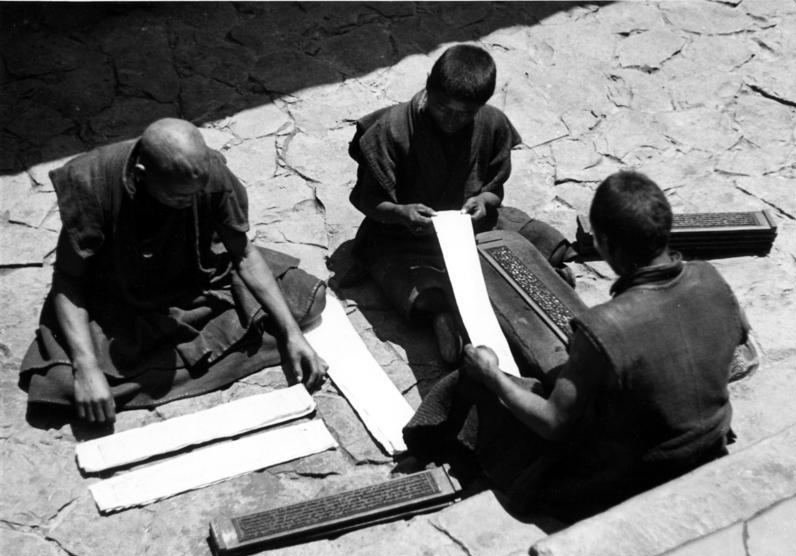
Tibetan Buddhist manuscripts handmade with woodblock printing method by Tibetan buddhist monks of Tashilhunpo, Shigatse, Tibet, in 1938

=== Buddhist tantras ===
The late Seventh century saw the rise of another new class of Buddhist texts, the Tantras, which focused on ritual practices and yogic techniques such as the use of Mantras, Dharanis, Mandalas, Mudras and Fire offerings.

Many early Buddhist Tantric texts, later termed "action Tantras" (kriyā tantra), are mostly collections of magical mantras or phrases for mostly worldly ends called mantrakalpas (mantra manuals) and they do not call themselves Tantras.

Later Tantric texts from the eighth century onward (termed variously Yogatantra, Mahayoga, and Yogini Tantras) advocated union with a deity (deity yoga), sacred sounds (mantras), techniques for manipulation of the subtle body and other secret methods with which to achieve swift Buddhahood. Some Tantras contain antinomian and transgressive practices such as ingesting alcohol and other forbidden substances as well as sexual rituals.

Some scholars such as Alexis Sanderson have argued that these later tantras, mainly the Yogini tantras, can be shown to have been influenced by non-Buddhist religious texts, mainly Tantric Śaivism and the Śaiva tantras.

In East Asian Esoteric Buddhism and its Japanese offshoot, the Shingon school, the most influential tantras are those which focus on Vairocana Buddha, mainly, the Mahavairocana Tantra and the Vajrasekhara Sutra.

Buddhist Tantras are key texts in Vajrayana Buddhism, which is the dominant form of Buddhism in Tibet, Bhutan and Mongolia. They can be found in the Chinese canon, but even more so in the Tibetan Kangyur which contains translations of almost 500 tantras. In the Tibetan tradition, there are various categories of tantra. The Sarma or New Translation schools of Tibetan Buddhism divide the Tantras into four main categories:

- Kriyayogatantra
- Charyayogatantra
- Yogatantra
- Anuttarayogatantra

Anuttarayogatantra (Higher Yoga Tantra) is known in the Nyingma school as Mahayoga. Some of the most influential Higher Tantras in Indo-Tibetan Buddhism are the Guhyasamāja Tantra, the Hevajra Tantra, the Cakrasamvara Tantra, and the Kalacakra Tantra. The Nyingma school also has unique tantras of its own, not found in the other Tibetan schools, the most important of these are the Dzogchen tantras.

=== Other products of the Vajrayana literature ===
Tibetan Buddhism has a unique and special class of texts called terma (Tibetan: gTer-ma). These are texts (or ritual objects, etc.) believed either composed or hidden by tantric masters and/or elementally secreted or encoded in the elements and retrieved, accessed or rediscovered by other tantric masters when appropriate. Termas are discovered by tertöns (Tibetan: gTer-stons), whose special function is to reveal these texts. Some termas are hidden in caves or similar places, but a few are said to be 'mind termas,' which are 'discovered' in the mind of the tertön. The Nyingma school (and Bön tradition) has a large terma literature. Many of the terma texts are said to have been written by Padmasambhava, who is particularly important to the Nyingmas. Probably the best known terma text is the so-called Tibetan book of the dead, the Bardo Thodol.

A sadhana is a tantric spiritual practice text used by practitioners, primarily to practice the mandala or a particular yidam, or meditation deity. The Sādhanamālā is a collection of sadhanas.

Vajrayana adepts, known as mahasiddha, often expounded their teachings in the form of songs of realization. Collections of these songs such as the Caryāgīti, or the Charyapada are still in existence. The Dohakosha is a collection of doha songs by the yogi Saraha from the 9th century. A collection known in English as The Hundred Thousand Songs of Milarepa was composed by Tibetan Buddhist yogi Milarepa and is especially popular amongst members of the Kagyu school.

The Blue Annals (Standard Tibetan: deb ther sngon po) completed in 1476CE, authored by Gölo Zhönnupel (Tibetan: gos lo gzhon nu dpal, 1392–1481), is a historical survey of Tibetan Buddhism with a marked ecumenical view, focusing upon the dissemination of various sectarian traditions throughout Tibet.

Namtar, or spiritual biographies, are another popular form of Tibetan Buddhist texts, whereby the teachings and spiritual path of a practitioner are explained through a review of their life story.

Kūkai wrote a number of treatises on Vajrayana Buddhism, and these are influential in Japanese Shingon Buddhism.

== See also ==
- Abhidhamma Piṭaka
- Atthakatha
- Āgama (Buddhism)
- Buddhavacana
- Buddhist Publication Society
- Chinese Buddhist canon
- Dhammapada, one of the most widely read and best known Buddhist scriptures
- Dhamma Society Fund
- Early Buddhist Texts
- Gandharan Buddhist Texts, the oldest Buddhist manuscripts yet discovered
- Index of Buddhism-related articles
- List of historic Indian texts
- List of suttas
- Mahayana sutras
- Pali Canon
- Pali Literature
- Pali Text Society
- Palm-leaf manuscript
- Pariyatti (bookstore)
- Sanskrit Buddhist literature
- Sutta Piṭaka
- Taishō Tripiṭaka
- Tibetan Buddhist canon
- Timeline of Buddhism
- Tripiṭaka Koreana
- Vinaya Piṭaka
- Yana, Buddhist schools into "yanas" or "vehicles"
