= Therīgāthā =

Buddhist collection of short poems

- SuttaCentral; OpenTipitaka
- Type: Canonical text
- Parent: Khuddaka Nikāya
- Attribution: 73 therīs; Bhāṇaka
- Aṭṭhakathā: Paramatthadīpanī (Therīgāthā-aṭṭhakathā)
- Commentator: Dhammapāla
- Abbreviation: Thig; Thī

The Therīgāthā, often translated as Verses of the Elder Nuns (Pāli: therī elder (feminine) + gāthā verses), is a Buddhist collection of short poems supposedly spoken or authored by Buddhist elder nuns. The poems belong to a later period in the development of canonical Buddhist literature, composed over centuries, with some dating to the late third century BCE.

In the Pāli Canon, the Therigatha is classified as part of the Khuddaka Nikaya, the collection of short books in the Sutta Pitaka. It consists of 73 poems organized into 16 chapters. It is the companion text to the Theragatha, verses attributed to senior monks. It is the earliest known collection of women's literature composed in India and worldwide.

== Authorship ==
The Therigatha verses predominantly represent a late stage of canonical Buddhist literature. These verses generally lack historical context, and even when they are supposedly connected to known figures from the Vinaya and the life of Gotama Buddha—such as Pajāpati, Nandā, or Ambapāli—they appear to be generic compositions that could have been written by anyone and simply attributed to these names.

According to Bernard Faure, there is no evidence that these verses were actually composed by the women they are attributed to. The text was compiled, edited, and annotated by a monk named Dhammapala.

== Overview of the text ==
The poems in Therigatha were composed orally in the Magadhi language and were passed on orally until about 80 B.C.E., when they were written down in Pali. It consists of 494 verses; while the summaries attribute these verses to 101 different nuns, only 73 identifiable speakers appear in the text. Like the Theragatha, it is organized into chapters that are loosely based on the number of verses in each poem.

While each poem in the Theragatha has an identified speaker, several of the Therigatha texts are anonymous, or are connected with the story of a nun but not spoken to or by her—in one case, no nun seems to be present, but instead the verse is spoken by a woman trying to talk her husband out of becoming a monk.

More so than the Theragatha, there seems to have been uncertainty between different recensions about which verses were attributable to which nuns—some verses appear in the Apadāna attributed to different speakers. Longer poems later in the collection appear in the Arya metre, abandoned relatively early in Pali literature, but include other features indicative of later composition, including explanations of karmic connections more typical of later texts like the Petavatthu and Apadāna.

A section of the Paramathadippani, a commentary attributed to Dhammapala, provides details about the Therigatha.

== Composition and Inspiration ==
The concept of ancient India aesthetics was based on the central premise of “savors”, eight classical emotional states known as bhāva expressed in artistic texts, each of the emotions with their own associated savors as follows: love with sensitive, humor with comic, grief with compassionate, anger with furious, energy with heroic, fear with apprehensive, disgust with horrific, and astonishment with marvelous. The intention with these savors was not to have the audience to experience them directly, but to “[savor] them as an aesthetic experience at one remove from the emotion.”

Ideally, a text would convey one dominant savor; given that it was long enough, it was expected to provide the audience with supplementary savors as well. All eight of these savors can be found within the Therīgāthā’s writings, in part due to the utilization of similies and “lamps”, “a peculiarity of poetry in Indian languages…that allows a poet to use, say, one adjective to modify two different nouns, or one verb to function in two separate sentences…In English, the closest we have to this is parallelism combined with ellipsis.”

== View of the female body ==
The Therīgāthā as a whole was likely collected over a series of centuries; as part of the oral tradition preserved by the monks, the verses may have some semblance of the attitudes held by the early Buddhist communities, thus they may enlighten an audience to the sometimes contradictory attitudes towards the female body by the early Theravāda tradition.

The Buddhist tradition's paradoxical perspective of women indicates even more complexity within the religion, as well as the organization of society. Despite being viewed as "physically and spiritually weaker, less intelligent, and more sensual than men," monks relied heavily on the generosity of laywomen to provide financial support for the Sangha; alternatively, women have been portrayed in a more positive light—on occasion, nuns have been considered to be more capable and enlightened than most monks. The fact that there are more complimentary allusions to laywomen in the text than nuns is confusing, implying some institutional prejudice against women who renounce their worldly relationships and familial responsibilities, a clash between faith and cultural expectations.

An account from the nun Subhā reveals Buddhist views of not just the female form, but of the physical form in general; while walking along the path to a mango grove, a rogue blocks her path and accosts her, attempting to seduce her with appeals to sensual desire, fear, and physical possessions, evoking emotions renunciation is intended to overcome. Ignoring her refusal, the rogue goes on to compliment her eyes, to which she removes her eye and offers it to the man, promptly causing him to beg her forgiveness. Demonstrating such utter detachment from her body frees Subhā from the unwanted advances of the rogue, as well as exemplifying the ultimate goal of detachment in Enlightenment.

== Significance ==
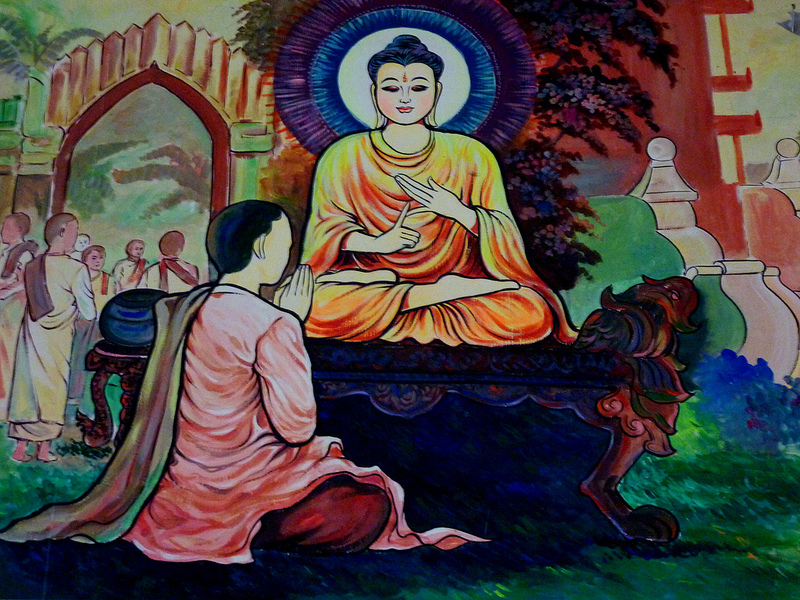
Mahapajapati, first Buddhist nun and Buddha's stepmother ordains

Despite small size, the Therigatha is a very significant document in the study of early Buddhism as well as the earliest-known collection of women's literature. The Therigatha contains passages reaffirming the view that women are the equal of men in terms of spiritual attainment, as well as verses that address issues of particular interest to women in ancient South Asian society.

Included in the Therigatha are the verses of a mother whose child has died (Thig VI.1 and VI.2), a former sex worker who became a nun (Thig V.2), a wealthy heiress who abandoned her life of pleasure (Thig VI.5) and even verses by the Buddha's own aunt and stepmother, Mahapajapati Gotami (Thig VI.6).

== Authenticity ==
Although the Therigatha is generally regarded as one of the earliest examples of text depicting women’s spiritual lives, it is believed the text may have been composed almost two centuries after Shakyamuni Buddha’s passing. While several of the poems within the Therīgāthā are assigned an author, the matter of who exactly compiled the writings is subject to conjecture.

According to Thānissaro Bhikkhu, "Some scholars have proposed that the Therīgāthā w[as] compiled as part of the movement to provide early Buddhism with dramatic stage pieces as a way of making the teaching attractive to the masses.” The style of several poems within the text support this theory; the texts read like dramatic dialogues or monologues as opposed to a realistic depiction of the events unfolding in the nuns’ lives.

Thānissaro Bhikkhu goes on to argue that the manner in which poems are introduced—“Cooled am I,” “calmed am I,” or “unbound”—indicate a lack of Enlightenment, a remaining attachment to the self. While many of the poems relay how the authors attained Enlightenment, these processes are sparse in detail considered important in other Buddhist texts. For instance, although these texts indicate abandonment of attachment to the body as necessary to attaining Enlightenment, the lack of detail indicates this to be the mark of total Enlightenment as opposed to merely a stage in the process of awakening.

This lack of detail is understandable in a dramatic piece; oversaturation takes away from the theatricality, whereas compressed tales more effectively relay messages. Taken as a true account, however, leads to an incomplete description of Buddhism’s practice.

== Translations ==
Twenty-first Century Translations

- Therigatha: Poems of the First Buddhist Women, translated by Charles Hallisey, Murty Classical Library of India, Harvard University Press (2015), hardcover, 336 pages, ISBN 9780674427730.
- Poems of the Elders, An Anthology from the Theragatha and Therigatha, translated by Ṭhānissaro Bhikkhu (Geoffrey DeGraff) (2015)
- Songs of the Elder Sisters, a selection of 14 poems from the Therigatha translated into verse by Francis Booth (2009), digital edition (Kindle).
- Therīgāthā: Book of Verses of Elder Bhikkhunis, Translated by Bhikkhu Mahinda (Anagarika Mahendra), Bilingual Pali-English Second Edition 2022, Dhamma Publishers, Roslindale, MA; ISBN 9780999078143.
- Verses of the Senior Nuns, translated by Bhikkhu Sujato and Jessica Walton (2019), SuttaCentral.

Twentieth-Century and Earlier Translations

- The First Buddhist Women: Translations and Commentaries on the Therigatha. translated by Susan Murcott. Parallax Press. 1991. ISBN 978-0-938077-42-8.
- Psalms of the Sisters, tr C. A. F. Rhys Davids, 1909; reprinted in Psalms of the Early Buddhists, Pali Text Society, Bristol; verse translation
- Elders' Verses, tr K. R. Norman, volume II, 1971, Pali Text Society, Bristol.

Non-English Translations

- Therigatha: Canti spirituali delle monache buddhiste con il commento Paramatthadipani di Dhammapala, traduzione di Antonella Serena Comba, Lulu (2016), 513 pages, ISBN 9781326047399.
- Therigatha: Poemas budistas de mujeres sabias translated into Spanish by Jesús Aguado (2018)
- D. Rossella, Buddhismo al femminile. Therīgāthā. Le Poesie spirituali delle monache. Con una introduzione alla dottrina del Buddha e la storia dell’ordine monastico delle donne, Milano, Guerini e Associati, 2019, ISBN 978-88-6250-787-5 | https://www.guerini.it/index.php/prodotto/buddhismo-al-femminile/

Online Translations in English

- Therigatha translation by Bhikkhu Mahinda
- Therigatha translation by Bhikkhu Sujato
- Therigatha Verses of the Elder Nuns Anthology of selected passages by Thanissaro Bhikkhu
- Psalms of the Early Buddhists: I. Psalms of the Sisters, London: Pali Text Society, 1909. Caroline A. F. Rhys Davids' 1909 translation of the complete Therigatha. "The 73 songs are organized by length; each is prefaced by Dhammapala's commentary of the 400s CE. The appendix gives translations of 10 songs by theri from another source, the Bhikkhuni-samyutta, apparently contemporary with the Therigatha. Note especially the second section of Rhys Davids' introduction, in which she discusses the lives and beliefs of the theri, and from which you can link to songs that deal with specific themes, e.g., freedom, peace."

== Related works ==
An additional collection of scriptures concerning the role and abilities of women in the early Sangha is found in the fifth division of the Samyutta Nikaya, known as the Bhikkhunī-Saṃyutta "Linked Discourses of the Nuns".

A number of the nuns whose verses are found in the Therigatha also have verses in the book of the Khuddaka Nikāya known as the Apadāna, often called the Biographical Stories in English. The Theri Apadāna contains verses from 40 Buddhist nuns recounting their past life deeds. Furthermore, there are also two extant Avadāna texts from the Mūla-Sarvāstivādin tradition: the Avadānasataka (surviving in Sanskrit, Tibetan and Chinese) and the Karmasataka (only survives in Tibetan).

There is also a Pali language commentary on the Therigatha by the medieval Theravada monk Dhammapāla. A translation by William Pruitt (1998) has been published by the Pali Text Society as Commentary on the Verses of the Theris: Therigatha-atthakatha : Paramatthadipani VI.

Furthermore, there is a Theravada commentary on the Aṅguttara Nikāya which provides detailed histories of the disciples of the Buddha, including their past lives and their deeds. A section of this text, the Etadagga-vagga commentary, provides extensive background to 13 outstanding nuns which are also named in the Therigatha. These biographies have been translated by Ānandajoti Bhikkhu.

=== Modern works ===
One modern study of the text is Kathryn R. Blackstone's Women in the Footsteps of the Buddha: Struggle for Liberation in the Therigatha (1998).

Vijitha Rajapakse has written an analysis of the feminist, religious and philosophical themes of the Therigatha in The Therīgāthā A Revaluation (2000).

Kyung Peggy Kim Meill has also written a study of the social background of the women in the text called Diversity in the Women of the Therīgāthā (2020).

A recent collection of original poems inspired by the Therigatha by the poet Matty Weingast has peen published by Shambhala Publications as The First Free Women: Poems of the Early Buddhist Nuns. It is described as a "contemporary and radical adaptation" in the book's back cover, and the author admits that they are "not literal translations".

At least one reviewer has described it as a "translation", even though he expresses qualms about how much of the original is obscured by the adaptation of the poet. Another reviewer, Liz Wilson, describes the language as "fresh" and "bold". However, Wilson points out that while in some cases "he has produced a poem that follows the language of the original closely, in other cases, the poem is more of a trans-creation than a translation."

Buddhist monks and nuns have also provided more serious critiques of this work. The Buddhist nun Ayya Sudhamma has the described the book as misleading and as bearing only a "superficial connection" to the originals. Bhikkhu Akaliko, in an extensive review of the book, concludes that it is "a disrespectful cultural appropriation" which erases the voices of the ancient Buddhist nuns and replaces them with the voice of the author who distorts the Buddhist teachings of the original.

Vietnamese American author An Tran characterizes Weingast's translation as possibly self-serving, and a fantasy antithetical to the Buddhist world of the original: "Weingast’s poems bear little to no resemblance to the poems of the Elder Nuns. They often strip away concepts like rebirth, karma, and spiritual attainments, replacing these key Buddhist doctrines with distortions derived from Buddhist modernism, the post-colonial revisionist movement originating in the 19th century, which sought to re-imagine Buddhism in the guise of rationalist philosophy and romantic humanism (a more appealing approach in the West)."
