= Oskar von Hinüber =

German Indologist (born 1939)

- Born: 18 February 1939 (age 87); Hanover, Germany
- Occupation: Indologist

Academic background
- Education: University of Tübingen; University of Erlangen–Nuremberg; University of Mainz

Academic work
- Institutions: German Navy; University of Mainz; University of Freiburg
- Notable works: Handbook of Pali Literature

Oskar von Hinüber (born 18 February 1939 in Hanover) is a German Indologist. He joined the German Navy after leaving high school, and holds the rank of commander as a reservist. From 1960 to 1966 he studied at University of Tübingen, University of Erlangen–Nuremberg, and University of Mainz, receiving his Ph.D. in 1966. From 1965 to 1981 von Hinüber served as assistant and then associate professor at Mainz and from 1981 was a professor of Indology at the University of Freiburg. He retired in March 2006.

Von Hinüber's special interests are Pāli, Sanskrit, and Middle Indo-Aryan languages, the history of technology in South Asia, inscriptions of the Northwest, and manuscripts and manuscript traditions in South and Southeast Asia. Among his many publications, the Handbook of Pali Literature is especially indicative of his comprehensive learning and scholarly authority.

== Publications ==
- A Handbook of Pali Literature (Berlin: de Gruyter, 1996. ISBN 3-11-014992-3)
- Indiens Weg in die Moderne
- Kleine Schriften (Veröffentlichungen der Glasenapp-Stiftung)
