= Apadana Residential Complex =

Apadana
- Planned town
- Interactive map of Apadana
- Coordinates: 35°42′43.7″N 51°19′26″E
- Country: Iran
- Province: Tehran province
- City: Tehran

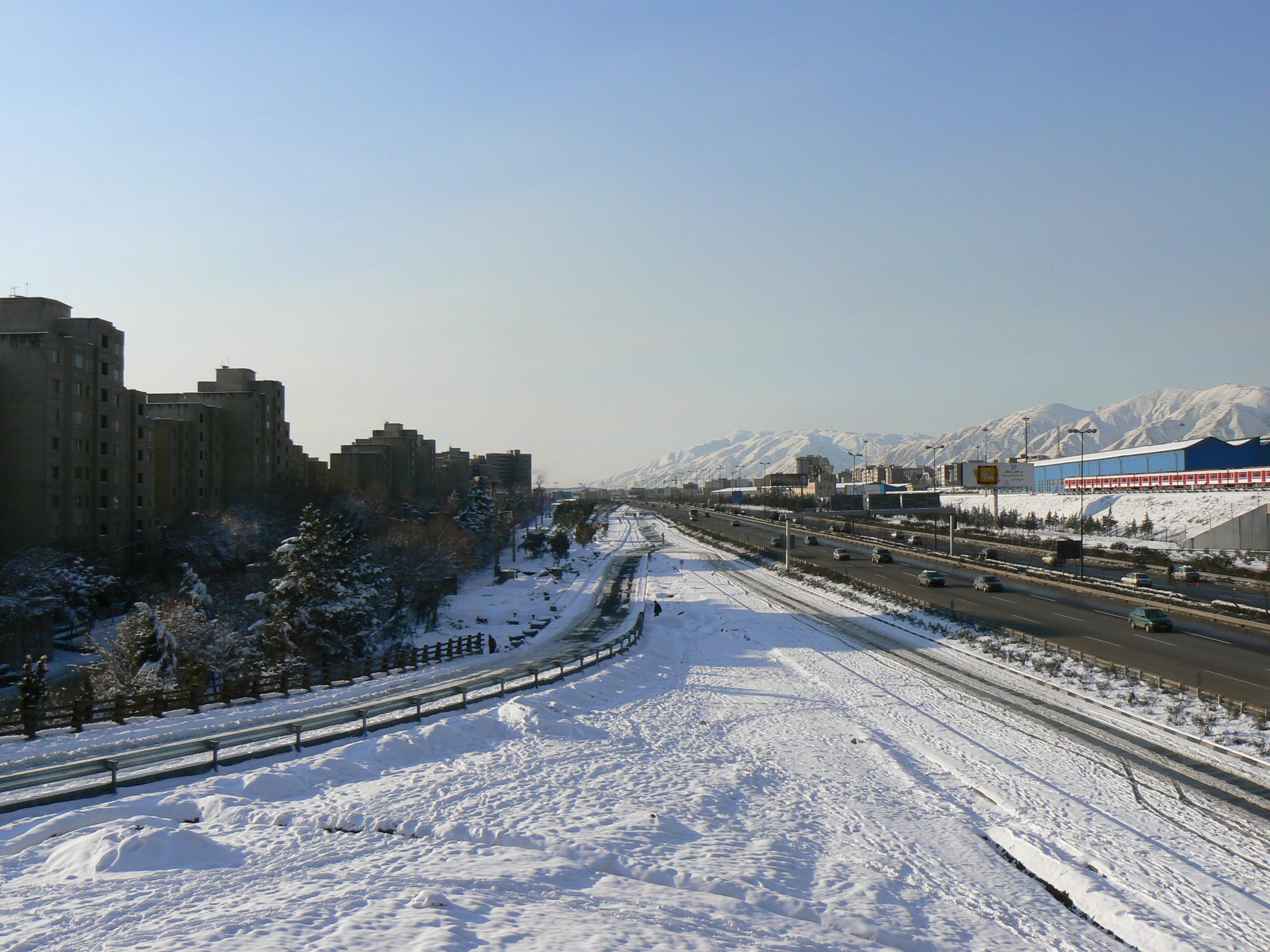
Hejazi Expressway (right) and Apadana (left)

Apadana Residential Society (Persian: شهرک آپادانا) is a planned residential society in the northwest of well known Azadi square in Tehran, Iran. It is located between Azadi Square and Ekbatan Complex.

== History ==
Construction of Apadana Complex started in the 1970s, and some parts of it were finished before 1978 Islamic revolution. Apadana was first occupied in 1981.

== Description ==
There are 46 blocks in Apadana Complex, comprising six "phases", each contains seven or eight blocks. Each phase has an administration office which is relatively independent in terms of decision making.

== Other information ==
The population of the Apadana Complex is about 15,000. It additionally includes three shopping centers, seven schools and a mosque.
