= Chizen Akanuma =

Japanese Buddhist scholar and priest

赤沼 智善
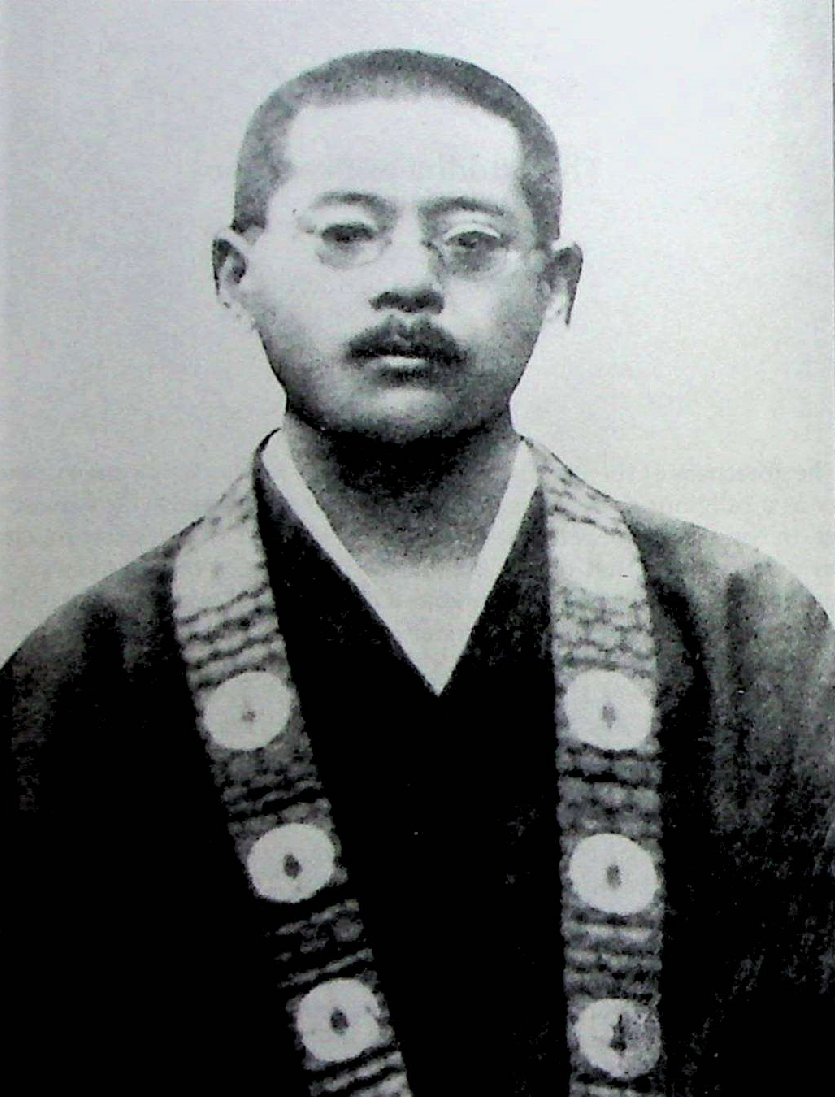
- Akanuma in his priest robes
- Born: August 25, 1884; Nagaoka, Niigata Prefecture
- Died: November 30, 1938 (aged 54); Kyoto
- Resting place: Japan
- Occupation: Buddhist scholar

Chizen Akanuma (Japanese: 赤沼 智善, Hepburn: Akanuma Chikuzen; August 25, 1884 – November 30, 1938) was a Japanese Buddhist scholar and priest within the Ōtani-ha branch of Shin Buddhism, and a professor of Ōtani University who specialized in pre-sectarian Buddhism.

== Biography ==
=== Early life and education ===
Chizen Akanuma was born in Nagaoka, Niigata Prefecture in 1884. His family was a monk of Ganjyo-ji temple under the Higashi Hongan-ji (Ōtani-ha sect, Jōdo Shinshū). He entered Shinshū University to study Buddhism. In 1909, he attended "Koukou do"(浩々洞), which was an association school built by Kiyozawa Manshi. After graduating from graduate school, he and Shūgaku Yamabe (山辺習学) went abroad to deepen their knowledge of Buddhism. He studied at India, Ceylon, and UK, and came back Japan in 1919.

=== As a Buddhist scholar ===
After coming back to Japan, he was appointed professor of Shinshū University and lectured on pre-sectarian Buddhism and Pali language. Chizen and his colleagues, Daisetsu Suzuki and Gessyo Sasaki established "The Eastern Buddhist Society" to spread the essence of Buddhism to Western countries.

His interest existed in the Early Buddhism (pre-sectarian Buddhism), and his research theme was the primitive Buddhist sect and Siddhartha Gautama's real sermons. He left works about Āgama or Nikāya. He died at his home in an unexpected accident in the morning of 1937.

== Publication ==
=== Books written in English ===
- "The comparative catalogue of Chinese Āgamas & Pāli Nikāyas" (Sri Satguru Publications, 1990)
- "A dictionary of Buddhist proper names" (Sri Satguru Publications, 1994)

=== Papers ===
- Digital Library of Buddhist studies (National Taiwan University): Publications of Chizen Akanuma
- CiNii>赤沼智善
