= Apadāna =

Collection of Buddhist biographical stories in the Khuddaka Nikaya of the Pāli Canon

- SuttaCentral: Therāpadāna; Therīapadāna; OpenTipitaka: Apadāna 1; Apadāna 2/Therīapadāna
- Type: Canonical text
- Parent: Khuddaka Nikāya
- Contains: Therāpadāna; Therīapadāna
- Aṭṭhakathā: Visuddhajanavilāsinī (Apadāna-aṭṭhakathā)
- Abbreviation: Ap; Tha Ap; Thi Ap

The Apadāna is a collection of biographical stories found in the Khuddaka Nikāya of the Pāli Canon, the scriptures of Theravāda Buddhism. G.P. Malalasekera describes it as 'a Buddhist Vitae Sanctorum' of Buddhist monks and nuns who lived during the lifetime of the Buddha.

It is thought to be one of the latest additions to the canon. The exact meaning of the title Apadāna is not known. Perhaps it means 'life history' or 'legend'. The term already features in a discourse in the Dīgha-nikāya, the Mahāpadāna Sutta, which surveys key episodes in the life of what are believed to have been seven previous Buddhas (DN 14). In Pāli the term apadāna has the additional, older meaning of advice or moral instruction. Dr Sally Cutler has suggested the word originally meant 'reapings', i.e. of the results of karma. The title is sometimes translated as the Biographical Stories, or simply as The Stories.

The Apadāna consists of about 600 poems (between 589 and 603 in different editions), mostly biographical stories of senior Buddhist monks and nuns, but also of Buddhas and solitary Buddhas. Many of the stories of monks and nuns are expansions of, or otherwise related to, verses presented in the Theragāthā and Therīgāthā as having been spoken by senior members of the early Sangha. The Apadāna is a parallel to the Jātaka commentary, in which the Buddha recounts his previous lives.

Most Apadāna stories follow a fairly predictable outline, in which the speaker recounts their meritorious deeds in previous births as ethical individuals in a variety of different circumstances in different parts of India, before finally recounting the story of their present birth and how they came to be disciples of the Buddha. These stories of the previous lives of famous and not so famous monks and nuns may have been meant to provide moral examples to lay followers who wished to live as Buddhists but were unable or unwilling to undertake ordination as bhikkhus or bhikkhunis.

The text is divided into four sections:

1. Buddha-apadāna: A praise of the previous Buddhas and their Buddha fields (buddhakkhetta). 1 chapter of 82 verses (in the Burmese Sixth Council edition)
2. Paccekabuddha-apadāna: Ānanda questions the Buddha about the enlightenment of solitary Buddhas (paccekabuddha). 1 chapter of 47 verses.
3. Thera-apadāna: 55 chapters of 10 apadānas of senior monks. In total 547 verses.
4. Therī-apadāna: 4 chapters of 10 apadānas of senior nuns. In total 40 verses.

== Translations ==
A complete translation of the Apadāna into English has now been made by Jonathan S. Walters: Legends of the Buddhist Saints: Apadānapāli , Whitman College, 2017.

The following parts have also been translated into English.

- Buddhapadāna (the 1st), tr. Dwijendralal Barua, in B.C. Law Volume, Part II, Bhandarkar Oriental Research Institute, Poona, 1946, pages 186–9. Available at .
- Mahapajāpati-gotami-theriyapadāna in Jonathan Walters Gotami's Story in Buddhism in Practice, Donald S. Lopez Jr., Ed. Princeton University Press, Princeton, NJ. 1995. ISBN 0-691-04441-4.
- Paccekabuddhapadāna (the 2nd), tr Ria Kloppenborg, in The Paccekabuddha, E. J. Brill, Leiden, 1974
- Raṭṭhapālapadāna, tr Mabel Bode, in "The Legend of Raṭṭhapāla in the Pali Apadāna and Buddhaghosa's Commentary." In Melanges d'Indianisme: offerts par ses élèves à Sylvain Lévi, Paris, 1911: 183–192.
- Pubbakammapilotikabuddhapadāna, in The Udāna Commentary, tr Peter Masefield, Pali Text Society, Bristol, volume II.
- Pubbakammapilotikabuddhapadāna, in Pubbakammapilotika-Buddhāpadānaṁ: The Traditions about the Buddha (known as) The Connection with Previous Deeds or Why the Buddha Suffered. A text and translation of the verses in Apadāna 39.10 and their commentary in Visuddhajanavilāsiṇī by Ānandajoti Bhikkhu, 2012. Available at .
- Raṭṭhapālapadāna, tr Mabel Bode, in Mélanges d'Indianisme offerts par ses élèves à S. Lévi, 1911, Paris.
- 25 of the last 40 apadānas (of the nuns) are included in Commentary on Verses of Theris, tr William Pruitt, 1998, Pali Text Society, Bristol.

Italian translations:

- Puṇṇakattherapadāna, tr Antonella Serena Comba in "Santo, mercante e navigatore: la storia di Pūrṇa nel buddhismo indiano", in A. S. Comba, "La storia di Pūrṇa", Lulu, Raleigh 2014, pp. 16–18.

== See also ==
- Avadāna - broad cross-Buddhist-school Pali and Sanskrit literature including Apadāna-like material
