= Avadana =

Type of Buddhist literature

Avadāna (Sanskrit; Pali: Apadāna) is the name given to a type of Buddhist literature correlating past lives' virtuous deeds to subsequent lives' events.

Richard Salomon described them as "stories, usually narrated by the Buddha, that illustrate the workings of karma by revealing the acts of a particular individual in a previous life and the results of those actions in his or her present life."

This literature includes around 600 stories in the Pāli language Apadāna ("Legends"). There are also a large number in Sanskrit collections, of which the chief are the Mahāsāṃghika's Mahāvastu ("Great Book") and the Sarvāstivāda's Avadānaśataka (Century of Legends) and Divyāvadāna (The Heavenly Legend). These latter collections include accounts relating to Gautama Buddha and the third-century BCE "righteous ruler," Ashoka.

Amongst the most popular avadānas of Northern Hinayāna Buddhism are:

- Ratnamālāvadāna, which is a collection of stories about traveling merchants.
- the story of Sudhana, preserved in the Mahāvastu under the title Kinnarī jātaka, amongst others, who falls in love with a kinnarī and saves her life.
- the Vessantara Jātaka, the story of the compassionate prince who gives away everything he owns, including his wife and children, thereby displaying the virtue of perfect charity.
- the Suvannasankha jātaka.

Though of later date than most of the canonical Buddhist books, avadānas are held in veneration by the orthodox, and occupy much the same position with regard to Buddhism that the Puranas do towards Hinduism. They act in a similar way to other texts describing past deeds or past lives held in other traditions in the region, such as the aforementioned Puranas, the Dasam Granth and Janamsakhis of Sikhism, and the Kalpa Sūtra of Jainism.

== See also ==
- Apadana - Collection of Avadanas in Pali Canon
- Jatakas - Type of Buddhist literature, stories about the past lives of Buddha
