= Donchee =

Type of Buddhist renunciant in Cambodia

A donchee (Khmer: ដូនជី) is a female Buddhist renunciant in Cambodia who renounces ordinary lay life to pursue a renunciant life of Dhamma practice.

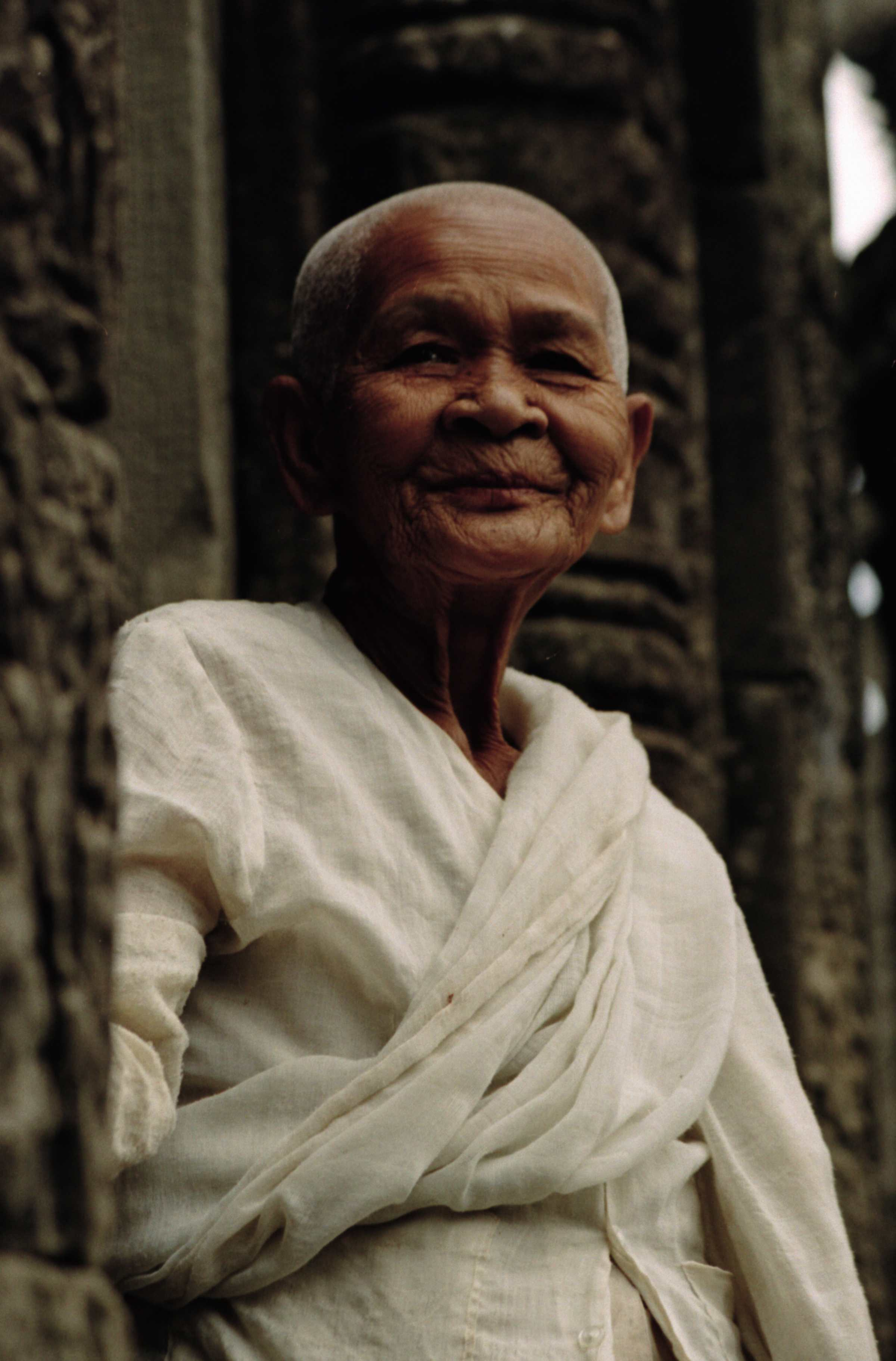
Buddhist Nun in Cambodia

== History ==
=== A Buddhist tradition of female renunciants ===
Female renunciants have been present since the origin of Buddhism.

In Sri Lanka and Myanmar, they have established monasteries for anagārikās. Similar orders exist in Thailand.

In Thailand, where it is illegal for a woman to take a bhikkhuni ordination, they are called maechi. In Burma, an eight precept nun is addressed as thilashin or sayalay, whereas a fully ordained woman is called a rahan-ma ("female monk").

In Cambodia, they are called donchees. According to Guthrie, dunchees are the "heirs of an ancient form of female asceticism that was once accorded high status in Cambodia".

=== Death and renewal for the widows of the Khmer Rouges ===
During the tyranny of the Khmer Rouges regime, public practise of Buddhism was forbidden, monks were defrocked and pagodas destroyed or used as granaries, prisons or execution sites. After the regime was overthrown, women who had lost their husbands and sons began the revival of Buddhism by cleaning the temples. After large number of widows were left derelict by the massacres of the Khmer population between 1975 and 1979, new donchee communities were formed as shelters.

=== In search of a place for women in contemporary Khmer Buddhism ===
After the fall of the Communist regime in 1991, the dunchee played an important role in the reconciliation of Cambodia, as the voat became a place where the dunchee could help heal the wounds and traumas of the younger generations and a conference was organized in Phnom Penh in 1997 to discuss this emerging role of the donchee.

However, the role and status of donchee and of women in general in Cambodian Buddhism is questioned. The fact that the monastic opportunities that exist for young men are largely absent for young women is one consequence of the fact that full female ordination is no longer available in Theravada Buddhism. Other see this inequality between the bikkhu and the dunchee as a form of complementarity where one can find refuge.

== Characteristics ==
Donchees, literally "granny" in Khmer, are usually elderly widows who find refuge in the hermitages around the Khmer pagoda in a form of béguinage. They shave their heads and wear a white or yellow robe. Most pagodas have special quarters to house nuns, though many choose to reside at home, supported by their children.

In total, there were approximately ten thousand dunchees all around Cambodia in the year 2000.

== Status ==
Dunchee have an "ambiguous position in Cambodian Buddhism". The status of dunchee is in between an ordinary upāsikā (laywoman) and a fully ordained bhikkhuni. They are usually expected to work in viharas, essentially as maids to ordained bhikkhus, rather than receiving training and the opportunity to practice.

One of the largest centers where dunches receive formation is at Vipassana Dhura Meditation Center. This center, at the foot of Oudong mountain fifty kilometers North of Phnom Penh, houses roughly 200 nuns. However, even there, gender disparity in roles performed by monks and donchee in Cambodian Buddhism have been criticized.

== Bibliography ==
- Goonalitake, Hema, "The Role of Ancient Cambodian Women in the Promotion of Buddhism", Paper for the International Conference on Khmer Studies, UNDP, Phnom Penh, 1993.
- First Conference on the Role of Khmer Buddhist Don Chee and Lay Women in the Reconciliation of Cambodia, Heinrich Boll Foundation, Cambodia, 1995.

== See also ==
- Anagārika
- Dasa sil mata
- Thilashin
- Maechi
- Siladhara Order
- Upāsaka and Upāsikā
