= Eight precepts =

Buddhist code of conduct observed during Uposatha days and festivals

In Buddhism, the Eight Precepts (Sanskrit: aṣṭāṇga-śīla or aṣṭā-sīla, Pali: aṭṭhaṅga-sīla or aṭṭha-sīla) is a list of moral precepts that are observed by Nuns, or Upāsakas and Upasikās (lay Buddhists) on Uposatha (observance days) and special occasions. They are considered to support meditation practice, and are often observed when staying in monasteries and temples.

They include ethical precepts such as refraining from killing any living being, but also more specific ones, such as abstaining from entertainments. The tradition of keeping the Eight Precepts on weekly observance days is still widely practiced in all Theravadin Buddhist countries and communities worldwide. Based on pre-Buddhist sāmaṇa practices, the eight precepts are often upheld on the Buddhist observance days (Sanskrit: upavasatha, poṣadha, pauṣadha, Pali: uposatha, posaha), and in such context called the uposatha vows or one-day precepts. In some periods and places the precepts were widely observed, such as in 7th–10th-century China by government officials. In modern times, there have been revival movements and important political figures that have observed them continuously.

== Description ==
Translations of eight precepts
- Chinese: 八戒/八關齋/八關齋戒 (Pinyin: bajie, baguan zhai, baguan zhai jie)
- Japanese: 八斎戒 (Rōmaji: hakkansai, hassaikai)
- Korean: 팔재계 (八齋戒) (RR: paljaegye)
- Sinhala: අට සිල් (ata sil)
- Tagalog: Walong utos
- Thai: ศีลแปด (RTGS: sin paet)
- Vietnamese: bát giới / bát quan trai / bát quan trai giới

The first five of the eight precepts are similar to the five precepts, that is, to refrain from killing living beings, stealing, damaging speech, and to abstain from intoxicating drink or drugs, but the third precept is abstinence of all sexual activity instead of refraining from sexual offenses. The final three precepts are to abstain from eating at the wrong time (after midday); to abstain from entertainment such as dancing, singing, music, watching shows, as well as to abstain from wearing garlands, perfumes, cosmetics, and personal adornments; and to abstain from luxurious seats and beds.

To summarise, following anthropologist Barend Jan Terwiel's translation from the Pāli language used in Thai ceremonies:

1. I undertake [to observe] the rule of abstinence from taking life
2. I undertake [to observe] the rule of abstinence from taking what is not given
3. I undertake [to observe] the rule of abstinence from sexual misconduct
4. I undertake [to observe] the rule of abstinence from false speech
5. I undertake [to observe] the rule of abstinence from intoxicants which cause a careless frame of mind
6. I undertake [to observe] the rule of abstinence from taking food at the wrong time
7. I undertake [to observe] the rule of abstinence from dancing, music, visiting shows, flowers, make-up, the wearing of ornaments and decorations
8. I undertake [to observe] the rule of abstinence from a tall, high sleeping place.

In Thailand, when the eight precepts are taken, it is believed that if one of them is broken, they are all broken. In the Pāli tradition, the precepts are described in the Dhammika Sutta, part of the Sutta-Nipāta. In many medieval Chinese texts, the order of the last three items is different, with numbers 6 and 8 switched.

== Purpose ==
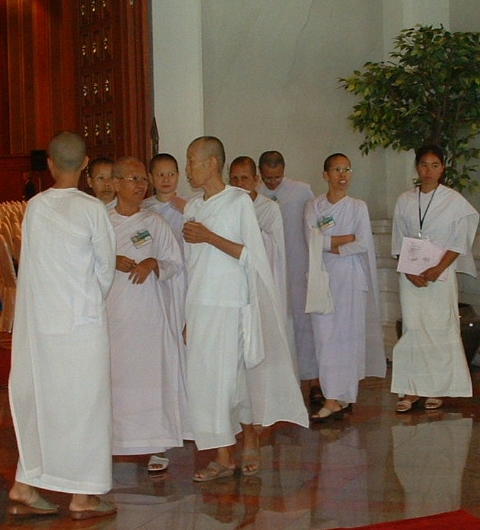
The maechi in Thailand observe the eight precepts all the time as part of their way of life.

In the context of uposatha practice, observing the eight precepts is described by the Buddha in the early texts as "cleansing of the sullied mind through expedient means" (Pali: upakkamena). The Pāli texts describe that one undertakes the eight precepts on the observance days following the example of the enlightened disciples of the Buddha. In the early texts, the Buddha is described as drawing a distinction between the Buddhist and Jain ways of upholding the uposatha. The Jain way is criticized as being more focused on outward appearance than substance, and the Buddhist practice is dubbed as genuine moral discipline. The eight precepts are meant to give lay people an impression of what it means to live as a monastic, and the precepts "may function as the thin end of a wedge for attracting some to monastic life". People who are observing the eight precepts are sometimes also addressed differently. The objective of the eight precepts is different from the five in that they are less moral in nature, but more focused on developing meditative concentration, and preventing distractions. Indeed, in Sri Lanka, lay devotees observing the eight precepts are expected to spend much time and effort on meditation, focusing especially on meditation on the parts of the body. This is intended to develop detachment.

== Practice ==
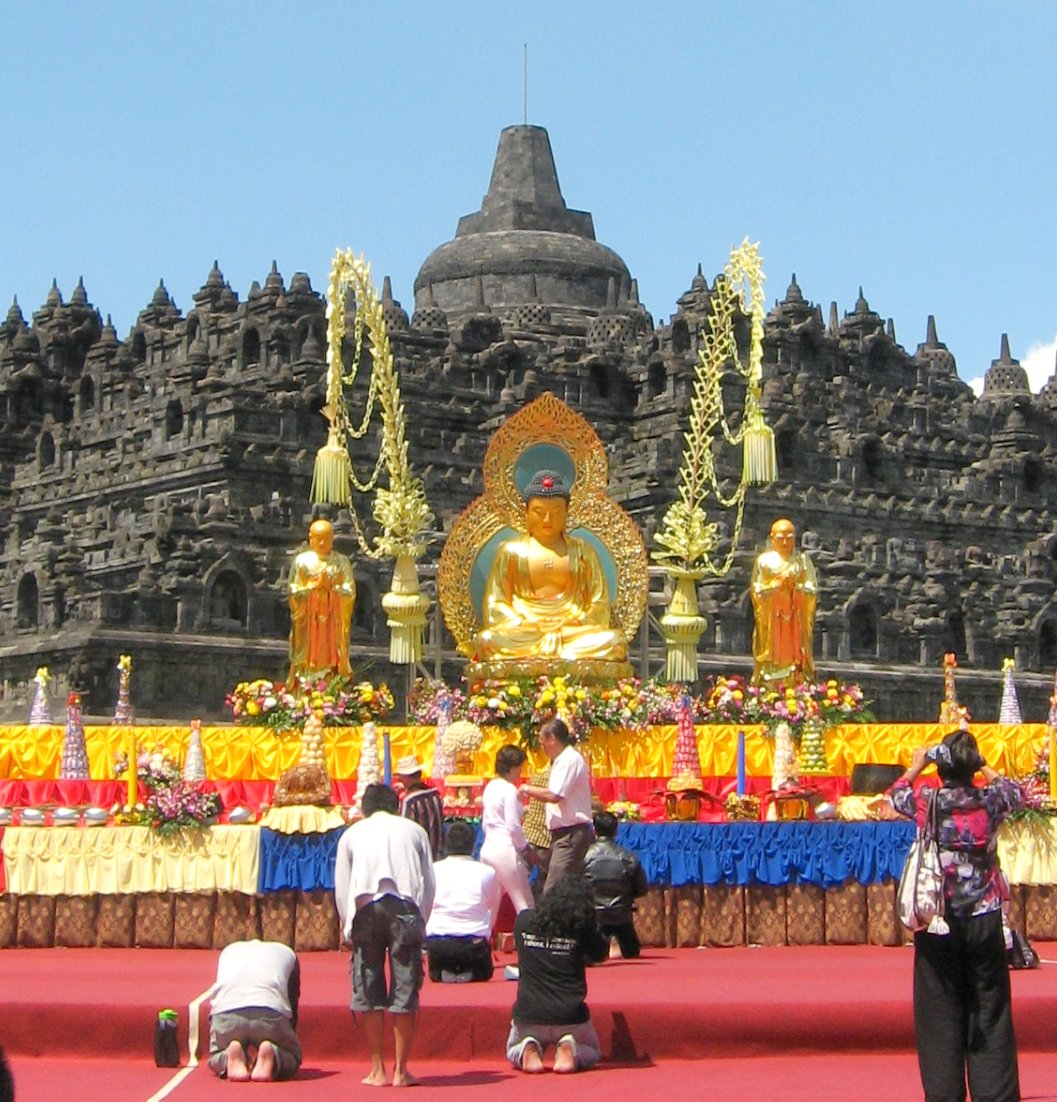
Buddhist lay devotees observe the eight precepts often during yearly festivals such as Vesak.

On regular observance days, Buddhist lay devotees often observe the eight precepts. In that context, the eight precepts are also called the uposatha vows (Sanskrit and Pali: upavāsa; Sanskrit: poṣadhaśīla, Pali: uposatha-sīla). When laypeople stay in a Buddhist monastery or go on a meditation retreat, they also observe the eight precepts often; they are also upheld during yearly festivals such as Vesak. Presently, the uposatha vows are mostly associated with Theravāda Buddhism in South and Southeast Asia, but it was a widespread practice in China as well, and is still practiced. In practice, in Theravāda traditions, the precepts are mostly observed by faithful devotees above 40 years of age. Since the eight precepts are often observed for one day, they are also known as the one-day precepts. Sometimes a formula is recited confirming the observance for one day (and one night):

"I undertake to observe in harmony during this day and this night these eight precepts that have been designed by the wisdom of the Buddha."

Observance does not need to be temporary, however: some lay devotees choose to undertake the eight precepts continuously to improve themselves in morality. The eight precepts are also undertaken by people preparing for ordination as a monk, sometimes called anagarika in Pāli or pha khao in Thai. Furthermore, many nuns in Buddhist countries, such as the mae chi in Thailand or the dasa sil mata in Sri Lanka, observe the eight or ten precepts all the time as part of their way of life.

Among the eight precepts, the first precept is about not killing animals. As recorded in the Edicts of Aśoka, there was a custom that he had established not to kill animals on the uposatha days, which indicates that by this time observance of Buddhist uposatha had become a state institution in India. The custom was most strictly observed on the full moon and the day following. The third precept is about maintaining chastity. Buddhist tradition therefore requires lay people to be chaste on observance days, which is similar to the historical Indian tradition of being chaste on parvan days. As for the sixth rule, this means not having food after midday, with an allowance for fluids, in imitation of a nearly identical rule for monks. Physician Ming-Jun Hung and his co-authors have analyzed early and medieval Chinese Buddhist Texts and argue that the main purposes of the half-day fast is to lessen desire, improve fitness and strength, and decrease sleepiness. Historically, Chinese Buddhists have interpreted the eight precepts as including vegetarianism.

The seventh precept is sometimes also interpreted to mean not wearing colorful clothes, which has led to a tradition for people to wear plain white when observing the eight precepts. This does not necessarily mean, however, that a Buddhist devotee dressed in white is observing the eight precepts all the time. As for the eighth precept, not sitting or sleeping on luxurious seats or beds, this usually comes down to sleeping on a mat on the floor. Though not specified in the precepts themselves, in Thailand and China, people observing the precepts usually stay in the temple overnight. This is to prevent temptations at home to break the eight precepts, and helps foster the community effort in upholding the precepts. (Note: See Terwiel (2012, p. 203) and Harvey (2000, p. 87). Only Harvey mentions China, and the sitting.)

== History ==
According to ethicist Damien Keown, the eight precepts were derived from the regulations described in the Brahmajala Sutta, an Early Buddhist Text. Since in this discourse the Buddha describes his own behavior, Keown argues that the eight precepts and several other moral doctrines in Buddhism are derived from the Buddha as a model figure.

Religion scholar J. H. Bateson and Pāli scholar Shundō Tachibana have argued that the eight precepts may be partly based on pre-Buddhist brahmanical practices (vrata) during the fast on the full and new moon, but more recent scholarship has suggested that early Buddhist and Jain uposatha practices did not originate in Brahmanism. The brahmin poṣadha was held in preparation for a sacrifice, whereas the Buddhist and Jain practices were not. Also, according to some scholars, Brahmanism did not migrate to the early Buddhist region till some time after the advent of Buddhism. Instead, Asian religion scholar Benjamin Schonthal and religion scholar Christian Haskett suggest that the Buddhist and Jain practice originate from a common, informal sāmaṇa culture, sāmaṇa (Pāli; Sanskrit: śrāmaṇa) referring to the non-Vedic religious movement current at the time of early Buddhism and Jainism. They base their argument on textual evidence that Jain and other samana also upheld uposatha practices. Finally, an earlier, less well-known theory by Indologist Jean Przyluski proposes a Babylonian origin. Przyluski argued that the lunar calendar followed in Buddhist uposatha practice was more likely to be based on Neo-Babylonian influence than Vedic, based on the distribution of observance days. (Note: See Haskett (2011, lead; note 3; Some problems with the upavasatha -> posaha / uposatha theory; posaha->upavasatha?) and Schonthal (2006, pp. 56–7). Schonthal discusses Jain customs, whereas Haskett discusses other sects. For the theory of Babylonian influence, see Przyluski (1936, pp. 388–390).)

Early Buddhist texts relate that the Buddhist uposatha originated as a response to other contemporary mendicant sects. Specifically, in the Pāli texts of monastic discipline, King Bimbisāra requests the Buddha to establish an uposatha practice, to keep up with competing sects. The Buddha then has the monks assemble every fortnight, and later he also has the monks teach lay people and recite the monastic code of discipline on the same days. Many of these practices were consciously borrowed from other sāmaṇa sects, as the uposatha ceremony became part of a wide program by the Buddha to make the spiritual practice of his followers "unique, disciplined and sincere".

In 6th-century Korea, the eight precepts came to be associated with worship of Maitreya, due to the work of Hyeryang, a Korean monk that wrote a tract about these matters. In 7th–10th-century China, government officials would often observe the eight precepts for one or more months a year, during which they often invited monks to teach them at home. On the same months that were designated for such religious observance, called the chai, the government also refrained from executing death penalties.

=== Modern history ===
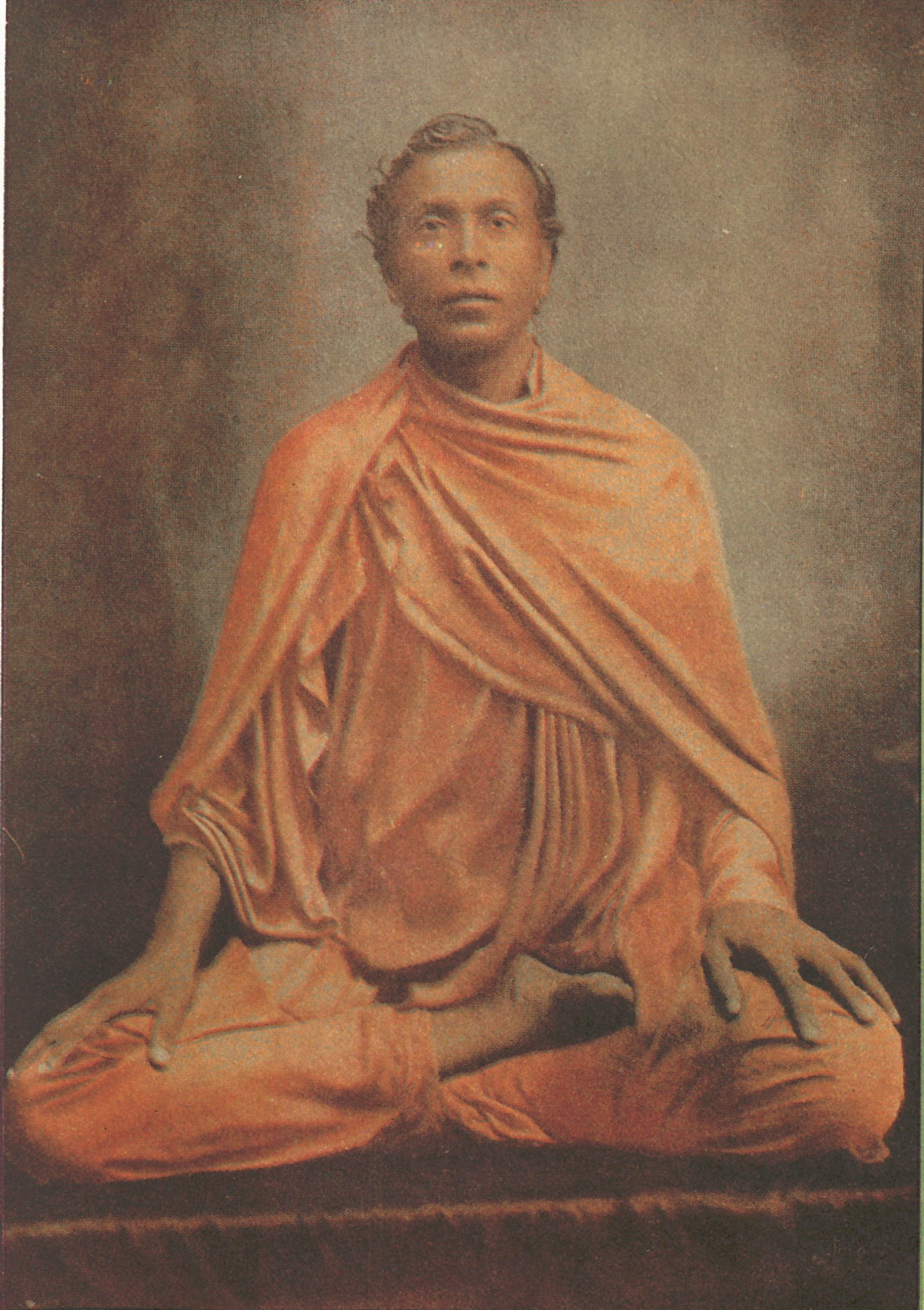
In 19th-century Sri Lanka, there was a revival of observing the eight precepts due to the influence of Anagarika Dharmapala.

In the late 19th century in Sri Lanka, there was a renewed interest in the tradition of observing the eight precepts, during the time of the Buddhist revival. This was mostly because of the influence of Anagarika Dharmapāla (1864–1933), who observed the ten precepts (similar to the eight) continuously, maintaining a status between lay person and monk. The interest was further fostered by campaigns emphasizing Buddhist religious practice on traditional observance days. The Thai politician Chamlong Srimuang (b. 1935) has been known for observing the eight precepts continuously, even during his life as a politician. He has been a member of the Buddhist Santi Asoke movement, which interprets the eight precepts as eating one vegetarian meal a day. Srimuang's strict life following the precepts has led his friends to call him "half monk–half man". Just like the Santi Asoke, the Thai Dhammakaya Temple emphasizes eight precepts, especially in their training programs. In Sri Lanka, in the 2000s, the eight precepts were still observed with great strictness, as was noticed by Religion scholar Jonathan Walters in his field research. In Theravāda traditions in the West, the eight precepts are observed as well.

== See also ==
- Buddhist ethics
- Four Noble Truths
- Noble Eightfold Path
- Poya (Sri Lanka)
- Thilashin (Myanmar)
- Uposatha
