= Thilashin =

Theravada Buddhist nuns in Myanmar

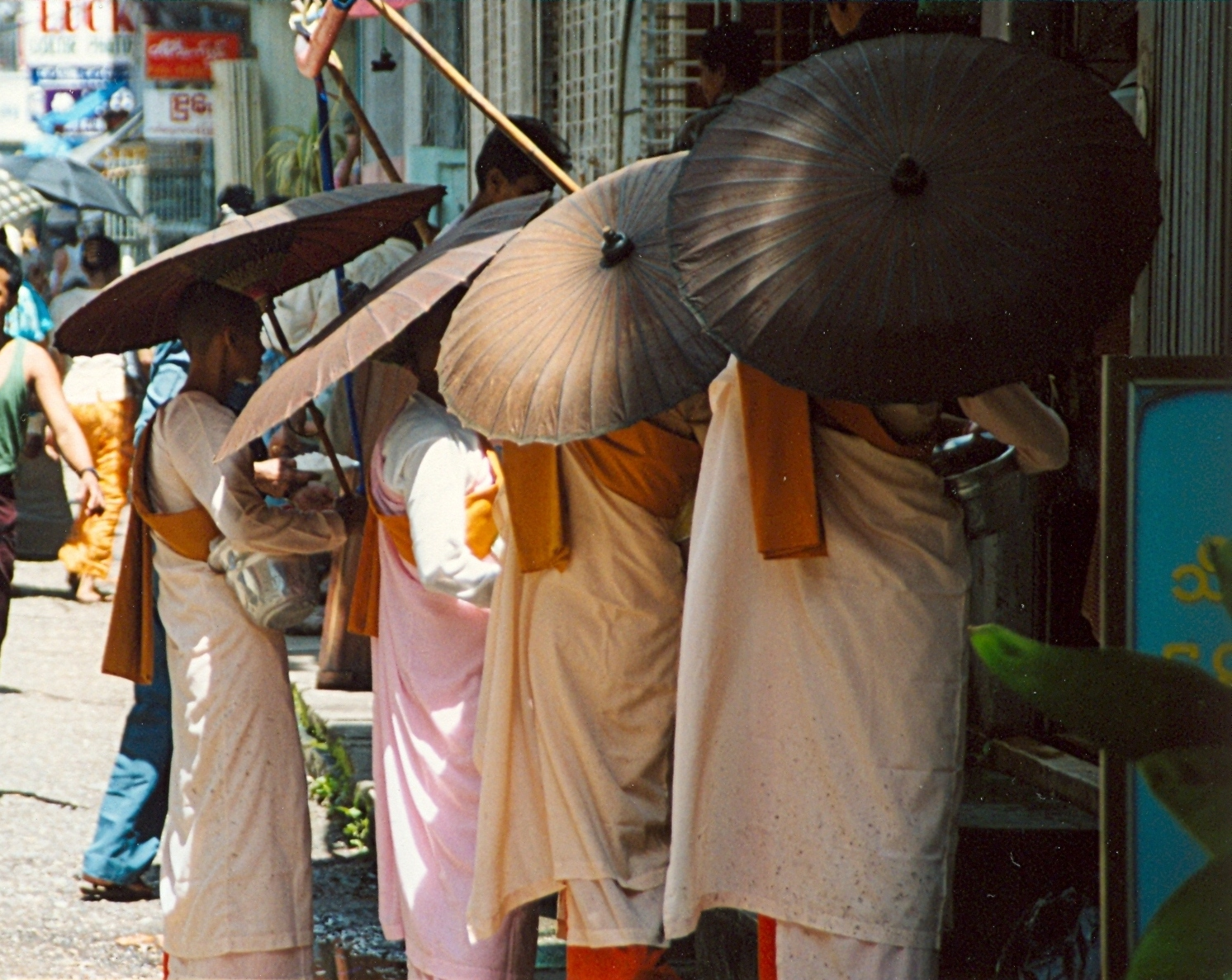
Thilashin during alms round in Yangon, Myanmar (Burma).

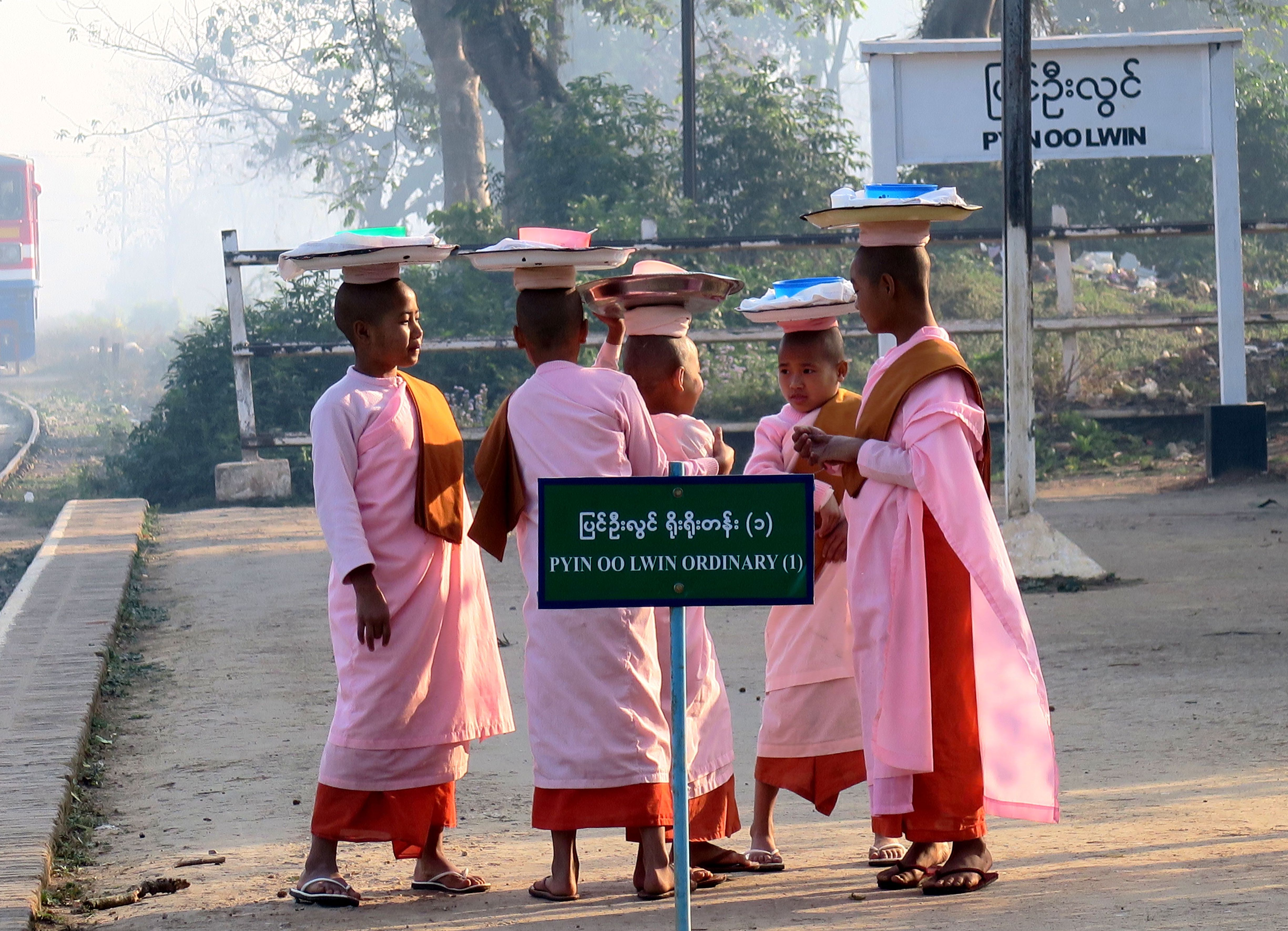
Young thilashin before alms round in Pyin Oo Lwin train station (Myanmar).

A thilashin (Burmese: သီလရှင်, pronounced [θìla̰ʃɪ̀ɰ̃],(Mon: သဳလ,[sɔəla]), "possessor of morality", from Pali sīla) is a female renunciant in Burmese Buddhism; a Burmese Theravada Buddhist nun. They are not fully ordained nuns (bhikkhuni), as the full ordination is not legal for women in Burma, but are closer to sāmaṇerīs, 'novice nuns'. According to 2016 statistics published by the State Sangha Maha Nayaka Committee, there were 4,106 nunneries and 60,390 thilashin in Myanmar (Burma), over a quarter of whom live in Yangon Region.

1. Yangon Region 16,960 (28.1%)
2. Sagaing Region 9,915 (16.4%)
3. Mandalay Region 8,174 (13.5%)
4. Ayeyarwady Region 5,520 (9.14%)
5. Bago Region 5,100 (8.45%)
6. Shan State 3,814 (6.32%)
7. Mon State 3,550 (5.88%)
8. Magwe Region 2,473 (4.10%)
9. Kachin State 1,103 (1.83%)
10. Kayin State 1,000 (1.66%)
11. Tanintharyi Region 978 (1.62%)
12. Naypyitaw 923 (1.53%)
13. Rakhine State 534 (0.88%)
14. Kayah State 303 (0.50%)
15. Chin State 43 (0.07%)

== Precepts ==
Like the maechi of neighbouring Thailand and the dasa sil mata of Sri Lanka, thilashin occupy a position somewhere between that of an eight-precept lay follower and a fully ordained monastic. However, they are treated more favourably than maechi, being able to receive training, practice meditation and sit for the same qualification examinations as the monks.

Thilashins observe the ten precepts and can be recognized by their pink robes, shaven head, orange or brown shawl and metal alms bowl. Thilashins would also go out on alms round on uposatha days and receive uncooked rice or money.

Thilashins are addressed with the honorifics sayalay (Burmese: ဆရာလေး; MLCTS: sa.rale:, [sʰəjàlé], 'little teacher') and daw (Burmese: ဒေါ်; MLCTS: dau:, [dɔ̀]). These are attached to the Buddhist name given.

Thilashins often reside in either separate quarters or in segregated kyaung (temple-monasteries). They do not have to look after the monks, but may help cook if required. Although ranked lower than the monks, they are not subservient to them, but form their own communities.

== Ordination ==
Thilashins are not fully ordained members of the Sangha. The full bhikkhuni lineage of Theravada Buddhism died out, being preserved only in the Mahayana tradition, and for various technical and social reasons was therefore absent, leaving the lay practice of living as a thilashin the only option for women who wish to renounce in Burma. As a result, in many respects the lifestyle of thilashins resembles that of an ordained bhikkhuni, even to the extent of making a daily alms-round.

There have been efforts by some thilashins to reinstate the bhikkhuni lineage, although there are serious reservations and legal obstacles from the government, monks and general populace. A new Theravada bhikkhuni sangha was first convened in 1996, and since then many more have taken the full vows. However, in Myanmar, thilashins remain the only monastic option for women at this time and ordaining as a bhikkhuni is an offence punishable by imprisonment.

== See also ==
- Anagārika
- Dasa sil mata
- Donchee
- Maechi
- Siladhara Order
- Upāsaka and Upāsikā
