= Dasasīlamātā =

Type of Buddhist renunciant in Sri Lanka

A dasasīlamātā (Pali) or dasa sil mata (Sinhala: දස සිල් මාතා) is an Eight- or Ten Precepts-holding anagārikā (semi-lay Buddhist renunciant) in Sri Lanka.

The status of dasa sil matas is in between an upāsikā (lay disciple) and a fully ordained bhikkhuni. The institution developed following the decline and eventual extinction of the bhikkhunī order in Sri Lanka, which disappeared and became defunct in the 11th century. Dasasīlamātās are distinct from bhikkhunīs and from laywomen who do not undertake a renunciant lifestyle.

Similar orders exist in Thailand, Cambodia and in Myanmar. In Thailand, they are called maeji, or maechee. In Cambodia, they are called donchees. In Burma, thilashin or sayalay.

== See also ==
- Anagārika
- Donchee
- Maechi
- Siladhara Order
- Thilashin
- Upāsaka and Upāsikā
