= Ayya (Pali word) =

Pali-language title of nobility in Buddhism

Ayya is a Pali word, translated as "honourable" or "worthy".

It is most commonly used as a veneration in addressing or referring to an ordained female Buddhist monk, most often of the Theravādin tradition in Southeast Asia. It is sometimes mistaken as equivalent to Christian use of the word, "sister." Ayya can refer to either a Bhikkhunī (fully ordained and usually wearing orange or yellow robes in Southeast Asia), a Samaneri (shramanerika) ten-precept novice renunciant, or a Sikkhamana (wearing white, brown or sometimes pink), but not to non-ordained precept-holders.

== See also ==
- Category:Theravada Buddhist monks
- Ajahn
- Bhante
- Sayadaw
- Therīgāthā
