= Siladhara Order =

English Buddhist female monastic order

The Sīladharā Order is a Theravada Buddhist female monastic order established by Ajahn Sumedho at Chithurst Buddhist Monastery, England. Its members are known as Sīladharās.

In 1983, he obtained permission from the Sangha in Thailand, to give a ten-precept pabbajjā to women, giving them official recognition as female renunciants trained in the Ajahn Chah lineage. The reasons for its establishment are due to the historical loss of the bhikkhunī (nun's) ordination in Theravada Buddhism, limiting renunciation for female Theravadins to ad hoc roles such as the thilashins and maechis, neither of which garner recognition from modern-day Theravada Buddhists as genuine renunciants.

== History ==
Ajahn Sumedho enlisted Ajahn Sucitto to train the nuns from 1984 to 1991. By 2008, sīladharās were trained in the discipline of more than one hundred precepts, including rules based on the pāṭimokkha of the bhikkhunī order. The order waxed and waned throughout its brief history, peaking at around 14, mostly living at Amaravati Buddhist Monastery.

== Status ==
In order to not violate national laws governing religious ordinations in predominantly Theravāda countries, with the notable exception of Sri Lanka, the Sīladharā Order is formally considered junior to that of bhikkhus or fully ordained men. Over the last twenty years, many siladhāras have therefore sought full bhikkhunī ordination with commensurate privileges, recognition and responsibilities enjoyed by male monastics. Making full ordination available to women is a cultural issue with significant implications for the welfare of young girls living in poverty in Asian countries where Theravada Buddhism is prevalent, especially Burma, Thailand, Cambodia, Laos and Sri Lanka. Speaking of Thailand, Lynne Hybels writes, "Young men in desperately poor families such as those in Chiang Rai can bring honor to their families by becoming monks, but girls are expected to provide financially. Traffickers understand this vulnerability, prey on it, and easily lure girls into life in the brothel." Such ordinations, however, are according to Buddhism itself motivated by wrong view; in particular, by careerism or economism, rather than by a sense of saṁvega and genuine renunciation.

After years of thorough discussion, Ajahn Sumedho issued a "Five-Point Declaration" concerning women's roles and rights in the Amaravati monastic community. This affirmed the status quo of seniority of male over female monastics. The declaration holds that while some teaching and management responsibilities are shared between the two orders according to capability, the Siladhara Order is unequivocally junior to that of the monks.

Many consider the "Five-Point Declaration" to be discriminatory against women. Some monastics and scholars also consider it to be an inaccurate interpretation of the vinaya and other texts, similar to the Three-Fifths Compromise in the United States Constitution or other codified examples of discrimination such as coverture. In addition, the violations of national law that had been sought to avoid were distinct from the vinaya itself, as argued by Ajahn Brahmavaṁso on the same matter.

Despite Ajahn Sumedho's best efforts at balancing contending interests, many female monastics living at Amaravati at the time left the monastery citing discrimination and lack of compassion on the part of Amaravati leadership. Subsequently, two sīladharās from this group founded a community in the United States. Along with numerous other women in recent years, these former Sīladharās have taken full bhikkhunī ordination.

=== 2009 Ordination at Bodhinyana ===
A number of Buddhist monastics worldwide have seen limitations, contradictions and ahistoricism in structural approaches to the Siladhara Order. On 22 October 2009 Ajahn Brahm facilitated an ordination ceremony for bhikkhunis where four female Buddhists, Venerable Ajahn Vayama, and Venerables Nirodha, Seri and Hasapanna, were ordained into Ajahn Brahm's lineage. Bhante Sujato along with his teacher Ajahn Brahm were involved with re-establishing bhikkhuni Ordination in the Forest sangha of Ajahn Chah. Sujato along with other scholars such as Brahm and Bhikkhu Analayo had come to the conclusion that there was no valid reason the extinct bhikkhuni order couldn't be re-established. The ordination ceremony led to Brahm's expulsion from the Thai Forest Lineage of Ajahn Chah. The ordination ceremony took place at Ajahn Brahm's Bodhinyana Monastery at Serpentine (near Perth, WA), Australia. For his actions of 22 October 2009, on 1 November 2009, at a meeting of senior members of the Thai monastic sangha, held at Wat Pah Pong, Ubon Ratchathani, Thailand, Brahm was removed from the Ajahn Chah Forest Sangha lineage and is no longer associated with the main monastery in Thailand, Wat Pah Pong, nor with any of the other Western Forest Sangha branch monasteries of the Ajahn Chah tradition. Bhante Sujato, remaining faithful to his convictions that there was no reason the order should not be revived, went on to found Santi Forest Monastery, and following Bhante Sujato's wishes, Santi became a Bhikkhunī (Buddhist nun's) monastery Vihara in 2012.
