= Maechi =

Buddhist nuns in Thailand

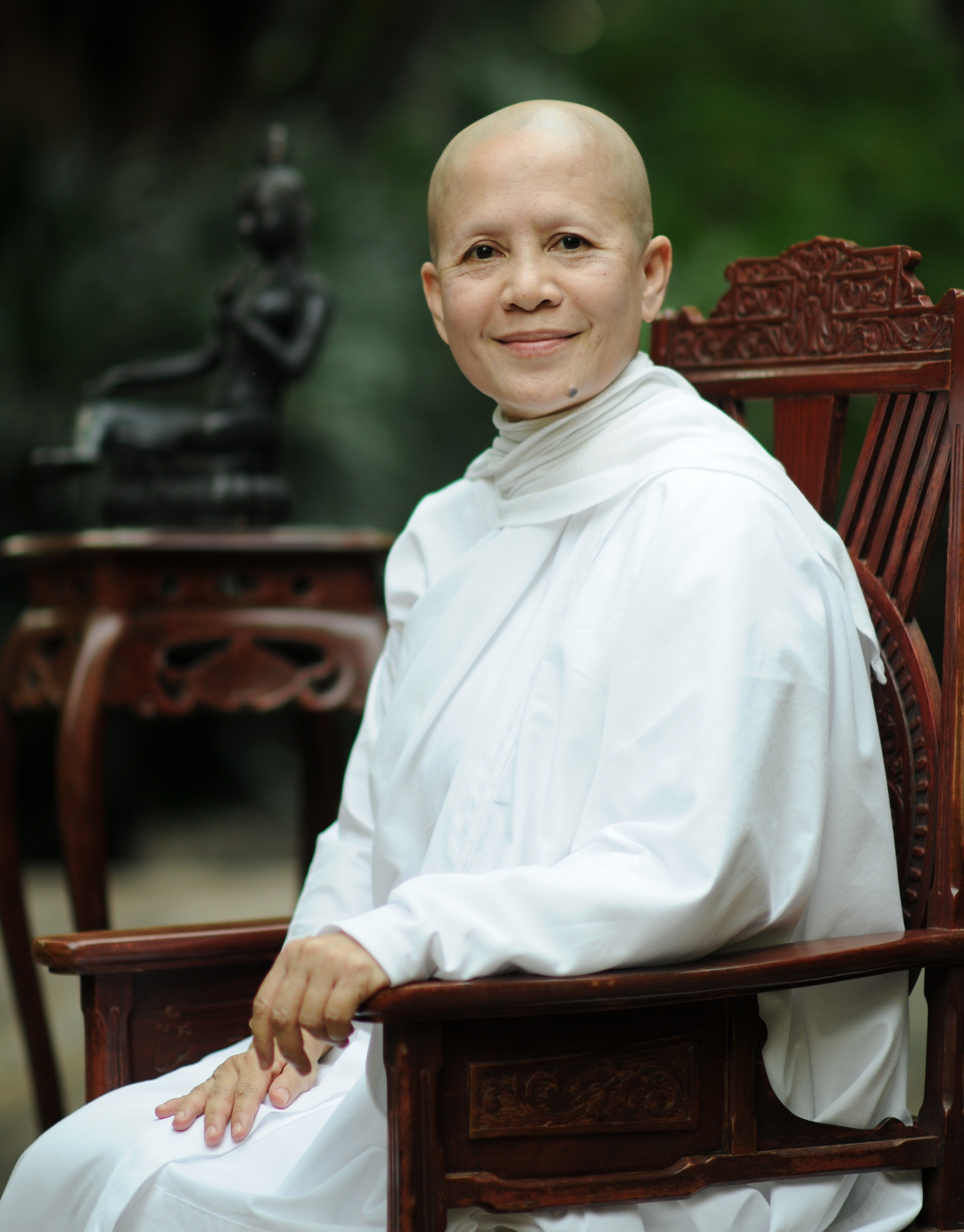
Maechi Sansanee, Thailand

Maechi, Maeji or Mae Chee (Thai: แม่ชี; IPA: [mɛ̂ː.t͡ɕʰiː]) are female Buddhist renunciants in Thailand. They renounce ordinary lay life to pursue an ascetic life of Buddhist practice. They observe eight or ten precepts, wear white robes, and formally occupy a position similar to that of a sāmaṇerī.

== Overview ==
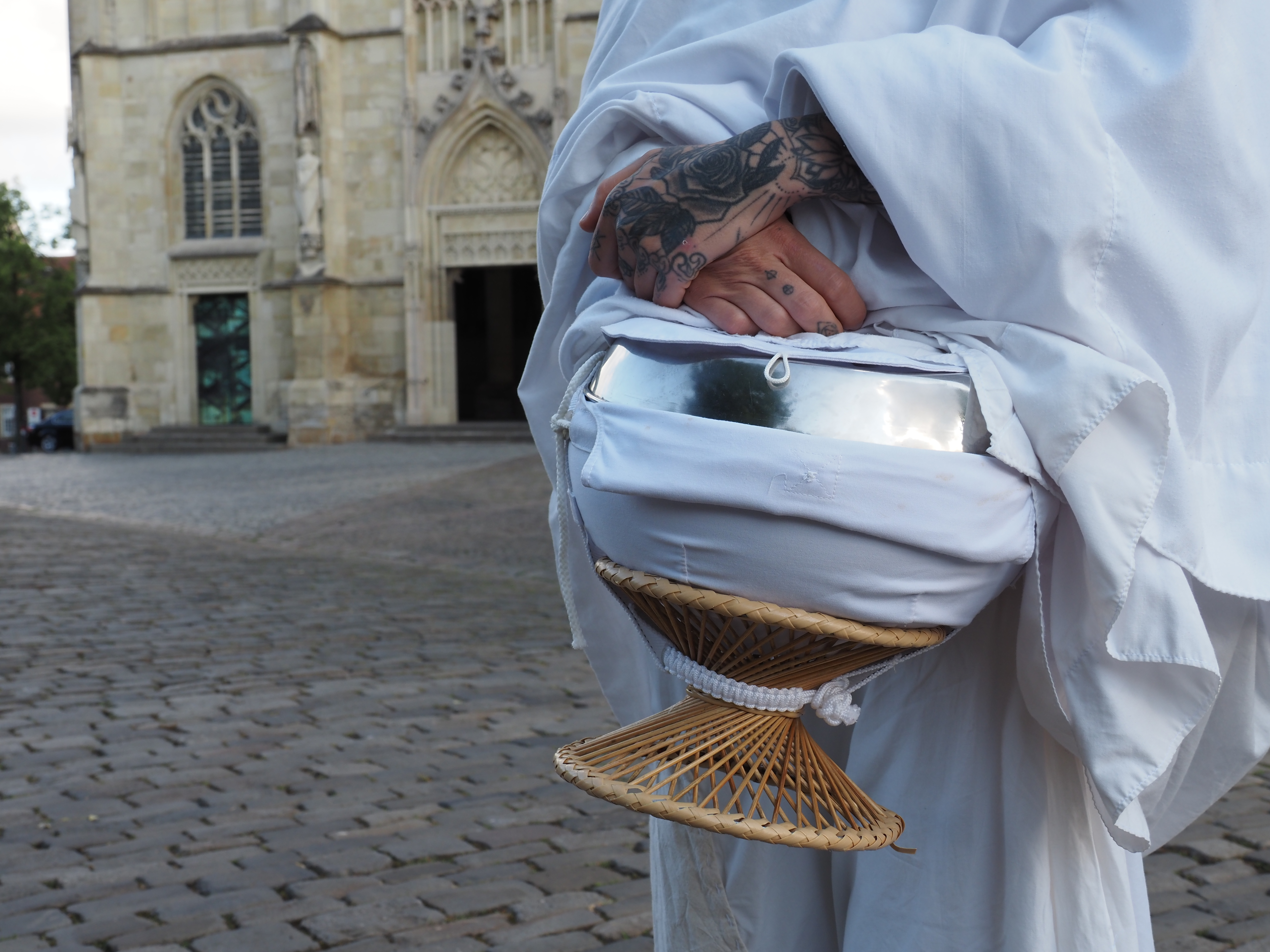
A Theravada Buddhist alms bowl (Pāli: patta) used by maeji on alms round (piṇḍapāta)

Like the thilashin of neighbouring Myanmar and the dasa sil mata of Sri Lanka, maechi occupy a position somewhere between that of an eight-precept Upasikā and a Buddhist Monk.

Like bhikkhus, maechis shave their heads and undertake precepts not generally observed by lay followers. Maechis most commonly receive these precepts from a qualified senior monk in a formal ordination ceremony. Maechis wear white robes, distinguishing them from both monks and lay people.

They are not ordained under 311 precepts ('bhikkhuni'). The full ordination is debated or illegal for women in some countries including Thailand since the original lineage of the historical Bhikkhuni Sangha dating back to Gautama Buddha died out between the 11th and 14th Century in Sri Lanka. In 1928 a law was created by the Supreme Patriarch of Thailand in line with attempts to preserve the distribution period (Sāsana) of the traditional early Buddhist Teachings. It is partly based on the traditional interpretation of rules regarding bhikkhunī ordinations according to the Vinaya Pitaka, requiring multiple senior bhikkhunis to initiate new nuns into the order, as well as the absence of fully trained female elders to facilitate suitably qualified apprenticeship for the female monastic aspirants.

As of 1998, the Theravadin Order of Nuns (Bhikkhunī) had been without any members for at least 700 years. While the officially recognized male monastic communities has traditionally received considerable oversight and assistance from various government ministries, only in the 20th century did the Thai Sangha begin to take an organized role in providing for the needs of maechis specifically. An institute now attempts to roughly track the number of nuns in the country, and provides funds that can be used for educational opportunities. They do not have the same legal recognition as bhikkhus by the Thai government and are not eligible for all monastic benefits such as free passage on public transportation, but they are like monks, omitted from voting or standing for civil elections.

Temporary maechis, who typically do not shave their heads, are called chi phram (Thai: ชีพราหมณ์; RTGS: chi phram).

Most maechis live on or close to wat and temple grounds. They sometimes share responsibilities with resident bhikkhus in supporting the temple, and often take on roles helping the monks in certain areas where the latter are more restricted by the Vinaya. Smaller numbers of maechis live in their own communities, which may or may not be associated with a local monastery.

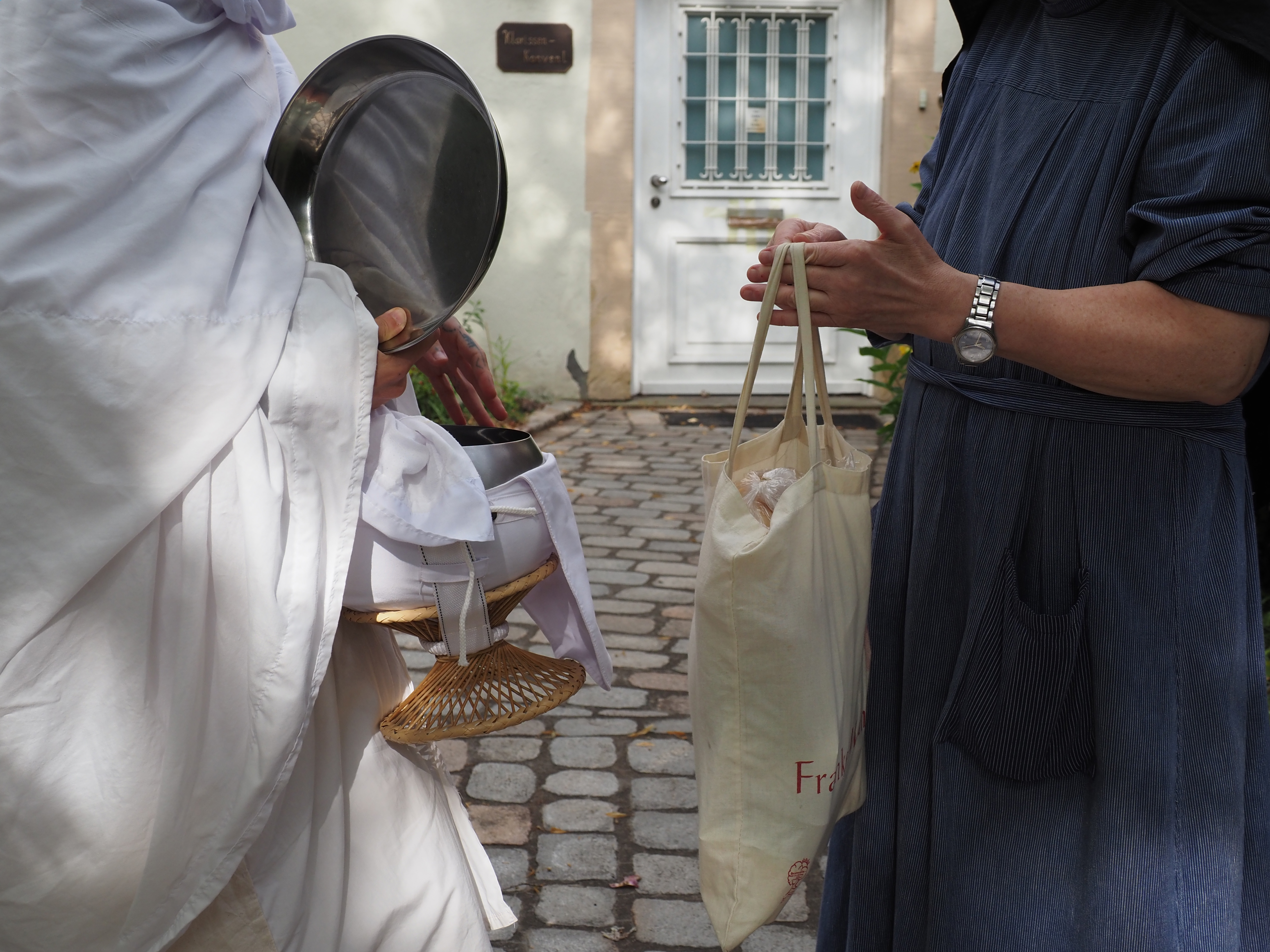
Maeji receiving food offering during piṇḍapāta

== History ==
Historically, little is known about the status and lives of maechis prior to Western contact with the kingdoms that preceded the modern state of Thailand. European observers in the 17th century reported seeing white-robed, shaven-headed nuns who lived on the grounds of Buddhist temples.

Records from prior to this time do not explicitly mention maechis in Thailand; it is likely that some records were lost in the destruction of the Ayutthaya Kingdom in the 18th century. The marginalization of the maechis in Thai society may also play a role in their exclusion from the historical record.

Suphaphorn Phumphuang wrote in 1995 that literature on maechii began to appear around 1945 to 1955 (Suphaphorn 2538/1995).

Since 1971 there has been a Queen's Foundation for Thai Maechi, addressing maechi affairs.

In 1969, the first nationwide meeting of maechis was organized by the Supreme Patriarch of Thailand. During the same year, the Queen's Foundation for Thai Maechi was formed to organize maechis scattered throughout Thailand.

A private organization affiliated with the official church hierarchy, the Institute receives no government funding and is dedicated to the stability and progress of maechi, increasing faith in maechi among the people and training maechi to help lay society.

The institute seeks to improve conditions for nuns by providing better access to education, and screening and placing potential maechis and seeks to ensure that all maechis possess basic knowledge of Buddhist teachings and proper monastic behavior. The institute has also attempted to discourage maechi from begging for alms as monks do. Instead, older maechis (who are particularly at risk for poverty) are increasingly placed in old-age homes.

Despite the absence of a full bhikkhuni ordination in Thailand, a number of other groups of female renunciants emerged in Thai society during the 20th Century. The buddhasavikas are a very small organization of women who have received ordination from Taiwanese Buddhist lineages such as Fo Guang Shan. The sikhamats were female renunciants ordained by the Santi Asoke movement. They lived a communal life, kept a strict vegetarian diet, and attempted to be self-supporting through organic farming and daily manual labor. Even though it is illegal to ordain women as 311 precept nuns, attempts have been made in recent history. The most recent case brought to the Supreme Court of Thailand is that of Phothirak, a former monk who has been ejected from the Thai sangha after being convicted of breaching the Vinaya repeatedly. Phothirak then created his own sect, Santi Asoke, and ordained about 80 bhikkhunis in 1998, leading to his imprisonment for 66 months on several successive counts of "causing schism amongst the sangha". Attempts at reviving the Thai bhikkhunī order has been made by Dhammananda Bhikkhuni, who took ordination in a reestablished bhikkhunī lineage in Sri Lanka without being imprisoned as a result. Opposition from high-ranking monastics seems to have discouraged maechis from joining her.

== Status and institutional barriers in Thailand ==
The Thai government lacks a consistent policy regarding maechi across its various ministries. The Department of Religious Affairs does not officially recognize maechi, viewing their presence in temples as conditionally allowed only because they assist monks. As a result, while monks, novices, and temple boys receive educational support, maechi are excluded from such benefits. Similarly, the Ministry of Transport classifies maechi as laywomen, meaning they are ineligible for transportation discounts. In contrast, monks and novices often receive free or discounted fares. On the other hand, the Ministry of Interior recognizes maechi as "skilled ordinands" (nakbuad) and, like monks, states that they are not entitled to vote.

Buddhism and education were traditionally closely linked through monastic schools in Thailand, where young boys would learn Buddhist teachings and literacy from senior monks. This system continued until the reign of King Chulalongkorn, when the government established its institutions for primary and secondary education. Today, temple schools still teach Buddhist teachings and modern subjects, but due to a lack of funding and resources, they mainly serve children from disadvantaged backgrounds. Furthermore, the decline of Buddhism in rural areas is closely related to the fact that the national education system has not reached these areas, which has contributed to a diminishing role of temples. In contrast, the socio-economic status of the maechi varies, with some, like Maechi Sannasinee, having access to abundant resources, while others lack sufficient resources. Among the women who have received a sufficient education, some choose to become maechi and lead a religious life. Most maechi have received only 4 to 6 years of elementary education, however, before becoming monastics. Since formal religious education was primarily a privilege of the monks, there are few maechi who have a deep understanding of Buddhist doctrine.

== Religious legitimization of gendered inequality ==
Émile Durkheim asserts that in the process of religious institutionalization, the concept of the "Sacred" is defined and valued through its contrast with the "Profane". Sacred objects and practices are protected and set apart by prohibitions, whereas profane things are those to which these prohibitions apply, necessitating their separation from the sacred. In this framework, it is the inherent inability of the profane to come into proximity with the sacred that serves to distinguish the two.

The yellow robe is seen as a symbol of the "Sacred" in Thailand, and only men are permitted to wear it within the Thai monastic community. Contact between monks and women is generally regarded as taboo. Even accidental contact is considered a minor violation, yet monks are still expected to avoid it. Thai society has adapted to these religious restrictions, and from a young age, women are taught to maintain a respectful distance when near monks. Through this male-only monastic order, women are relegated to the status of the "Profane" in Thai society.

The most common is to repay their debt of gratitude to their parents. Ordination is widely seen as the greatest way to accumulate merit for one’s parents, as it is believed that they gain merit through their child's ordination. Traditionally, mothers could not ordain themselves, so ordaining for one’s mother has been reported as a major motivation for men. In the past, women were prohibited from approaching monks or the sacred saffron robes. Today, however, with temporary samaneri ordination available for women, traditional gender norms are being redefined so that the role of repaying parents has already empowered Thai women significantly.

== Gender and role of maechi in Thai Buddhism ==
During the 1980s and 1990s, maechi were commonly associated with stereotypes, such as being "heartbroken young women", "fragile and sickly individuals unable to cope with daily stresses", or "elderly women with little education and no family support". These views remained prevalent into the year 2000.

In Thai temples, maechee (female novices) are the only women allowed to reside. They are referred to using the term "ruup", which is also used for monks, a term not applied to lay followers. In Chiang Mai, there are reports that maechi, who are skilled in meditation, are believed to share their merit with disciples. In reality, however, the daily lives of many maechi are primarily spent on household tasks such as cooking and cleaning for monks, leaving little time for meditation practice or the deepening of their skills. From a religious perspective, since maechi are "ordained", they are expected to transcend gender, much like monks and bhikkhunis. In other words, they should no longer be conscious of sexual feelings or the differences between men and women ("jitjai mai mee phaet mai mii khwaam ruuseuk reuang phaet mai mee phaet ying ru phaet chaai" – “There is no gender in the mind, and there is no feeling of gender differences between male and female”). However, if they are in a "lay" position, they may be seen as beings who know and enjoy sexual desire. Thus, maechee are regarded as sexually ambiguous figures, and their moral status is often considered equally ambiguous. As figures embodying gender ambiguity, maechee are historically, linguistically, and even in terms of residence, close to monks, which is why they are often seen as a "dangerous presence" for male monks. The proximity of women living in the temple to male monks is seen as potentially "polluting", breaking the monks’ sexual indifference. The Thai Maechi Association Foundation has established a strict code of conduct for maechi. The regulations include:

1. Maechi may receive a wai (a traditional gesture of respect), but they are only allowed to initiate a wai for monks or royalty.
2. Maechi are prohibited from eating with others who are not maechee, such as nuns from other sects.
3. They are not allowed to hold children (whether male or female).
4. Maechi are prohibited from purchasing food at night.
5. They should not sit next to men on public transportation, such as boats, buses, or taxis.

The discourse among maechee rarely addresses their own sexuality. This is largely due to cultural beliefs that women should avoid discussing matters of sex and the value system that dictates that ordained individuals should not possess sexual desire.

== Prominent figures ==
Maechee Kaew (or Kyaw, 1901-1991) was a student of the famous Thai Forest Master Ajahn Mahā Boowa. She was a respected Buddhist teacher to monks, nuns, and laity alike. She is considered one of the arahants of the modern era.

Born in a rural village in northern Thailand, Maechee Kyaw joined the Buddhist order at a young age. She quickly gained a reputation for her meditative attainments, compassion and ability to connect with people from all walks of life. She has given countless talks and sermons on a wide range of topics, including meditation, ethics, and the path to enlightenment. Maechee Kaew's teachings are characterized by their clarity, compassion, and practicality.

Maechee Kyaw has been recognized by the Thai government, as well as by international organizations. She has also received numerous awards and honors for her contributions to society. She has founded a multitude of social welfare organizations, including the Maechee Kyaw Foundation. These organizations provide a variety of services, such as education, healthcare, and vocational training, to those in need. Maechee Kyaw was also a vocal advocate for women's rights and has worked tirelessly to promote gender equality.

Maechee Kyaw is still one of the most prominent Buddhist female figures in Thailand.

Maechi Sansanee Sthirasuta (1953–2021) was one of Thailand's most prominent Buddhist nuns and the founder of Sathira-Dhammasathan, a Buddhist center in Bangkok dedicated to meditation, Dhamma practice, and social engagement. She became widely known for making Buddhist teachings accessible to the public through books, television, lectures, and retreats. Throughout her life, she emphasized mindfulness, compassion, women's spiritual development, environmental responsibility, and humanitarian service. Her work had a significant influence on contemporary Thai Buddhism and inspired countless lay practitioners, monastics, and community leaders.

Maechi Chandra Khonnokyoong (1909–2000) was a highly influential Thai Buddhist nun, meditation teacher, and co-founder of Wat Phra Dhammakaya. Renowned for her dedication to meditation practice, she attracted a large number of disciples and played a central role in shaping the early development of the Dhammakaya movement. Her teachings emphasized disciplined meditation, moral conduct, and the cultivation of inner peace. She remains one of the most influential female figures in modern Thai Buddhism, and her legacy continues through the worldwide activities of Wat Phra Dhammakaya and its associated communities.

== See also ==
- Sayalay — Burmese honorific for female Buddhist renunciants; from saya, meaning "teacher", with lay as an affectionate or respectful diminutive used to address female Buddhist renunciants, particularly Thilashin.
- Thilashin — Literally 'possessor of moral integrity'. Female lay renunciants in Myanmar. A branch of this lineage was also brought to Nepal in the 1930s.
- Dasasīlamātā, literally "10 precept mother": female Buddhist renunciants in Sri Lanka.
- Siladharas — Order of Theravadin monastics at Amaravati Buddhist Monastery, UK. They follow the basic 8–10 precepts plus a selection of rules from the bhikkhuni pātimokkha
- Anagarika — A Buddhist renunciant who observes the eight precepts and lives a celibate life, and has given up most or all of their worldly possessions and responsibilities to commit full-time to Buddhist practice.
- Kappiya — Buddhist lay manciple who resides in a monastery (vihāra) and assists Buddhist monks.
- Donchee (Cambodia) — Female Buddhist renunciants in Cambodia; literally "grandmother".
- Upāsaka and Upāsikā (Buddhist laity) — Male and female Buddhist lay followers who undertake varying numbers of precepts and support the Buddhist monastic community.
