= Renunciation =

Act of rejecting something previously endorsed

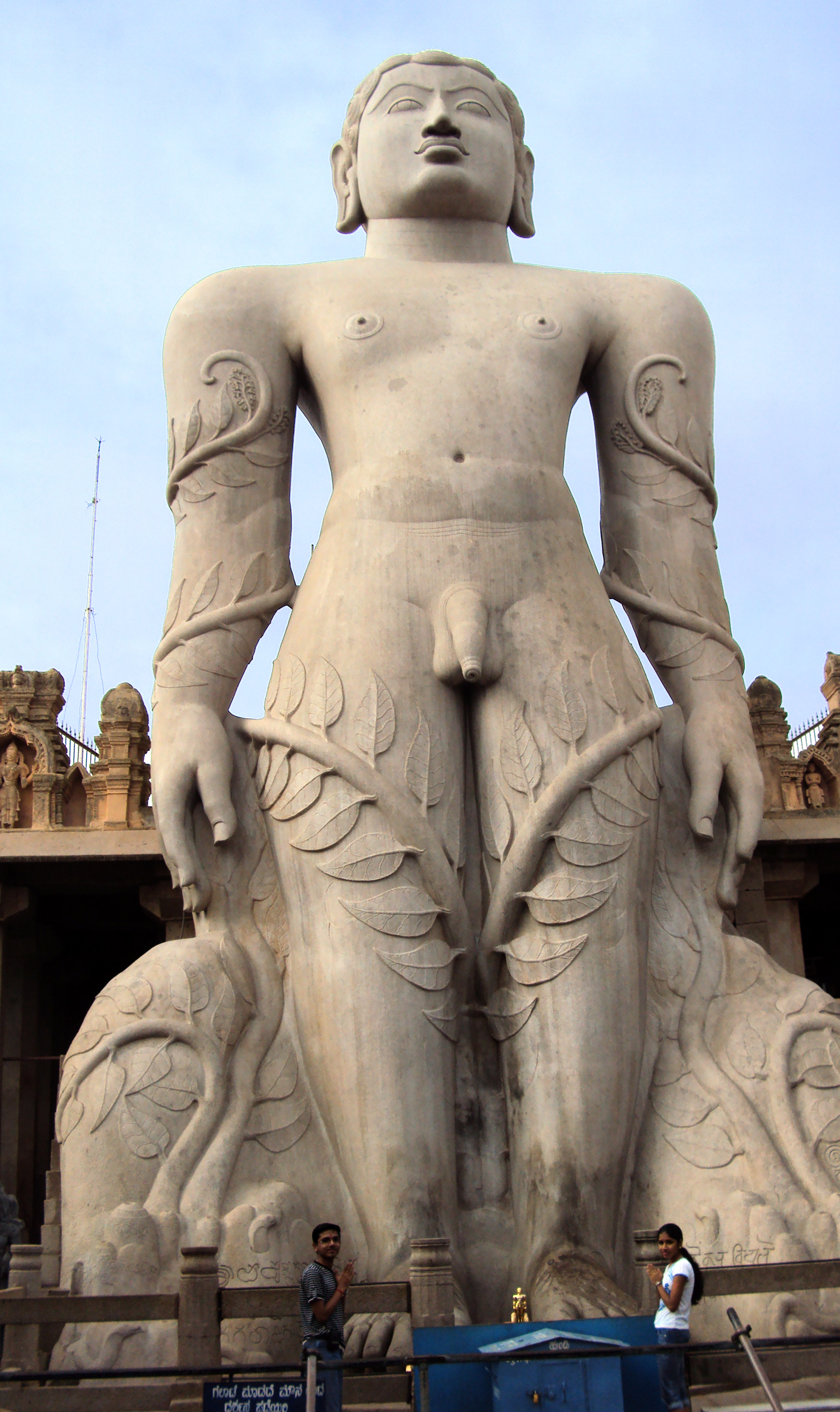
The Bahubali statue symbolising absolute renunciation of Samsara (the weary wheel of death and reincarnation).

Renunciation (or renouncing) is the act of rejecting something, particularly something that the renunciant has previously enjoyed or endorsed.

In religion, renunciation often indicates an abandonment of the pursuit of material comforts, in the interests of achieving Enlightenment, Liberation, or Kevala Jnana, for example as practiced in Buddhism, Hinduism, and Jainism respectively. In Hinduism, the renounced order of life is sannyāsa; in Buddhism, the Pali word for "renunciation" is nekkhamma, conveying more specifically "giving up the world and leading a holy life" or "freedom from lust, craving and desires" (See also sangha, bhikkhu, bhikkhuni, and śramaṇa.); and in Jainism renunciation is called virati. In Christianity, some denominations have a tradition of renunciation of the Devil.

Renunciation of citizenship is the formal process by which a person voluntarily relinquishes the status of citizen of a specific country. A person can also renounce property, as when a person submits a disclaimer of interest in property that has been left to them in a will.

== Buddhism ==
The live of Gautama Buddha illustrates the point as he demonstrated extreme renunciation and detachment in the performance of his karma. Gautama Buddha renounced a kingdom in the quest for truth.

== Hinduism ==
Renunciation in Hinduism is primarily associated with the Sanskrit terms saṃnyāsa and saṃnyāsin. Saṃnyāsa denotes the practice of renouncing worldly life to become a homeless wandering mendicant, while saṃnyāsin refers to an individual who adopts this lifestyle. These terms became prominent around the beginning of the Common Era and were widely used in the medieval period. Ancient texts such as the Dharmaśāstra more commonly used terms like pravrajita, parivrajaka, parivrat, bhiksu, śramaṇa, and yati for ascetics. In Hinduism, within the classical fourfold system of life stages (asrama), renunciation is codified as the fourth and final stage of life.

In Hindu traditions, renunciation (samnyasa) is taken in order to achieve ultimate spiritual liberation (moksa). Entry into a renunciate order requires a formal initiation ceremony that may include the ritual performance of the initiate's own funeral. This funerary rites signify that the initiate is socially dead and is no longer bound by the three goals of life; pleasure (kama), wealth (artha), and social duty (dharma). Upon initiation, the practitioner receives a new spiritual name and dedicates his entire life to the pursuit of liberation.

While traditional sannyasa regards the phenomenal world as distraction from the pursuit of liberation, modern Hindu movements have reinterpreted the social role of the renunciate. In the modern framework, selfless service (seva) to others is integrated into spiritual discipline (sadhana), allowing sannyasins to actively engage in charitable work, educational programs and relief work.

== Jainism ==
Jaina ethical texts establish two levels of renunciation, partial and complete, based on the extent of restraint undertaken by the practitioner. Partial renunciation(desa-virati) applies to the householder stage and complete renunciation (sarva-virati) applies to the monastic state.

Lay practitioners engage in progressive renunciation structured across eleven stages known as sravaka-pratima. These stages systematically increase restrictions on worldly conduct, personal property and household management. In the eleventh stage (uddistatyaga- pratima), the layman leaves the home permanently and renounces food specially prepared for him. In the Svetambara tradition, a layman at this stage is termed sramanabhuta (one about to become a medicant) and lives nearly as a monk without having taken formal monastic vows. In the Digambara tradition, this stage is divided into ksullaka ( a junior renunciate wearing three garments) and ailaka (wearing only a loincloth) as preparation for full ascetic nudity.

Complete renunciation occurs through an initiation ceremony called diksa or pravrajya. This ceremony marks a symbolic rebirth, during which the initiate surrenders all lay possessions and abandons his birth name. Monks observe the five great vows (mahavratas) fully, exercising continuous mindfullness to avoid harming even single-sense organisms such as plants.

The ultimate expression of Jaina renunciation is sallekhana (or samadhi-marana), a consecrated ritual of gradual fasting unto death. The practitioner systematically reduces solid food and liquid intake while abandoning all emotional attachments and worldly desires.

== Christianity ==
In some Christian denominations, renunciation of the Devil is a common liturgical rubric. This is most often seen in connection with the sacrament of baptism. In the Roman Catholic church a baptism usually contains the "Prayer of Exorcism". Later in the ceremony, the parents and godparents are asked to publicly renounce the devil.

The Church of England dismissed this rubric in a 2014 renewal of the liturgy. According to The Independent, this was done in an attempt to "widen the appeal" of the rite. A prior report for the Church's Liturgical Commission stated that "[f]or the majority of those attending, the existing provision can seem complex and inaccessible."

In the Church of Norway, the public renunciation of the Devil is an obligatory element in the main service. It is stated by the congregation before the profession of faith (usually the Apostles' Creed, as the Nicene Creed is largely reserved for special observances). When performed in a service which includes a baptism, it is also considered an extension of the testimony given by the sponsors, as they are required to confess to a denomination which does not reject the Apostles' or the Nicene Creed, nor rejects infant baptism.

== See also ==
- Asceticism

== Sources ==
- Flood, Gavin (1996). An introduction to Hinduism. Cambridge University Press. ISBN 978-0-521-43878-0.
- Jaini, Padmanabh S (1979). The Jaina Path of Renunciation. Motilal Banarsidass. ISBN 978-81-208-1578-0.
- Jacobs, Stephen (2010). Hinduism Today-An Introduction. Continnum International Publishing Group. ISBN 978-0-8264-3065-6.
