= Anagārika =

Pāli term referring to Buddhist lay renunciants

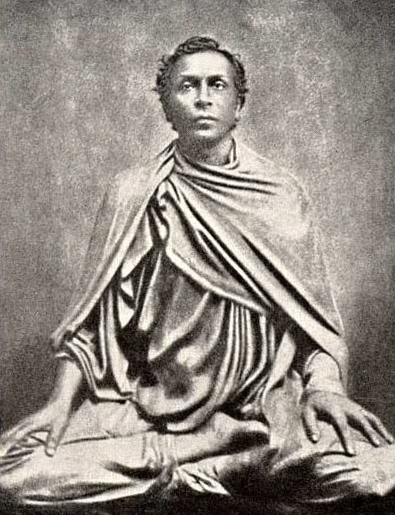
Anagarika Dharmapala

In Buddhism, an anagārika (Pali, "homeless one", [əˈnəɡɑːrɪkə]; feminine: anagārikā, [əˈnəɡɑːrɪkɑː]) is a person who adopts a homeless or renunciant life and relinquishes most or all worldly possessions and responsibilities in order to devote themselves full-time to Buddhist practice and activities, without entering the saṅgha as a fully ordained monastic. The status is intermediate between that of a layperson and a fully ordained bhikkhu or bhikkhuni. Unlike a novice, a sāmaṇera or sāmaṇerī, who formally takes ordination, wears monastic robes and observes ten precepts, an anagārika undertakes the Eight Precepts, a form of religious commitment that has gained some traction among Western Buddhists.

Before and during the time of the Buddha, groups in India had already left household life in favour of a more ascetic existence. These groups became formally organized and developed their own ritual and teaching traditions. Within Buddhism, the term anagārika was subsequently applied to those who similarly adopted a homeless life without formally entering the saṅgha.

== Notable Anagārikas ==
- Anagārika Dharmapāla
- Anagārika Govinda
- Anagārika Munindra
