= Sāriputta (12th century) =

12th-cent. Sri Lankan Theravada monk

Sāriputta Thera was a 12th-century Sri Lankan scholar monk of Theravada Buddhism. He was the first leader (Mahasvami) of the Sri Lankan Buddhist Sangha after Parakramabahu I's reforms and one of Theravada's greatest exegetes. He was the student of Mahakassapa Thera, who presided over the Buddhist council convened by Parakramabahu I and was likely present at the council himself. He was later abbot of the Jetavana Vihara of Polonnaruwa. He wrote at least five sub-commentaries (ṭīkā) on Buddhaghosa's commentaries to the Pali Canon as well as various compendiums and manuals on Vinaya (monastic discipline) and Buddhist Meditation practice. His Sarattha-dipani ("The Essence-Meaning Illustrator"), a sub-commentary on the Vinaya Commentary of Buddhaghosa, explains issues in Buddhaghosa's text and deals with further points from the Pali Canon and other Vinaya texts no longer extant.
