= Vinaya =

Buddhist monastic rules

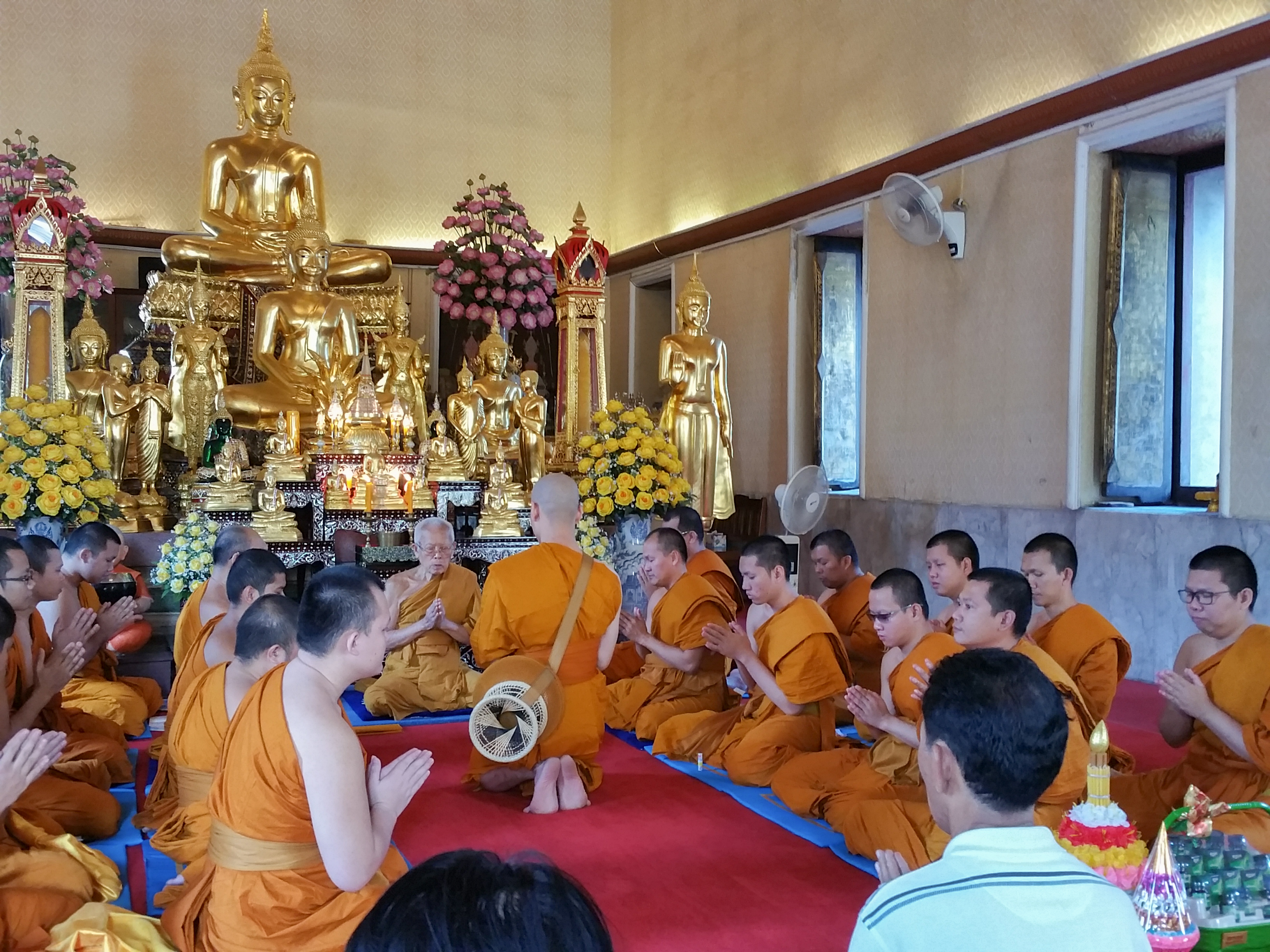
An ordination ceremony at Wat Yannawa in Bangkok. The Vinaya codes regulate the various official acts of the Buddhist monastic community (sangha-kamma), including the ordination of new monks.

Vinaya (Pali and Sanskrit: विनय) refers to numerous monastic rules and ethical precepts for fully ordained monks and nuns of Buddhist Sanghas (community of like-minded sramanas). These sets of ethical rules and guidelines developed over time during the Buddha's life. More broadly, the term also refers to the tradition of Buddhist ethical conduct. The term "Vinaya" also refers to a genre of Buddhist texts which contain these precepts and rules and discuss their application, along with various stories of how the rules arose and how they are to be applied. Various lists and sets of Vinaya precepts were codified and compiled after the Buddha's death in different Vinaya texts.

As one of the main components of the canonical Buddhist canons (Tripiṭakas), alongside the Sūtra and Abhidharma (Pāli: Abhidhamma), the Vinaya Piṭakas contains detailed prescriptions governing the behavior, conduct, and communal procedures of monks (bhikṣu) and nuns (bhikṣuṇī). These include rules of individual discipline (prātimokṣa), protocols for communal harmony, and guidelines for handling transgressions.

The word Vinaya is derived from a Sanskrit verb that can mean to lead, take away, train, tame, or guide, or alternately to educate or teach. It is often translated as "discipline", with the term Dhamma-Vinaya (doctrine and discipline) being used by the Buddha to refer to his complete teachings, suggesting its integral role in Buddhist practice. Thus, Vinaya also denotes the living tradition of ethical training and cultivation which encompasses inner moral discipline, and the communal process of ethical deliberation and confession within the sangha. In this sense, vinaya is not only legalistic but also pedagogical and soteriological, oriented toward the purification of ethical conduct (śīla) as a foundation for meditative concentration (samādhi) and wisdom (prajñā).

Over time, Buddhist Vinaya lineages split into various traditions, mirroring the development of the various Indian Buddhist schools. Three Vinaya traditions remain in use by modern ordained sanghas: the Theravada (Sri Lanka & Southeast Asia), Mulasarvastivada (Tibetan Buddhism and the Himalayan region) and Dharmaguptaka (East Asian Buddhism). In addition to these three Vinaya traditions, five other Vinaya schools of Indian Buddhism are preserved in Asian canonical manuscripts, including those of the Kāśyapīya, the Mahāsāṃghika, the Mahīśāsaka, the Sammatīya, and the Sarvāstivāda.

== Origins ==
According to an origin story prefaced to the Suttavibhaṅga, a Theravadin commentary on the Vinaya Piṭaka, in the early years of the Buddha's teaching, the sangha (community) lived together in harmony with no vinaya; there was no need, because all of the Buddha's early disciples were highly realized if not fully enlightened. After thirteen years and as the sangha expanded, situations arose which the Buddha and the lay community felt were inappropriate for mendicants.

According to tradition, the complete Vinaya Piṭaka was recited by Upāli at the First Buddhist council shortly after the parinirvana (the Buddha's death). All known Vinaya texts employ the same system of organizing rules and share the same sections, leading scholars to infer that the Vinaya's fundamental organization predates the separation of the various schools.

While traditional accounts fix the origins of the Vinaya during the lifetime of the Buddha, all of the existing manuscript traditions are from significantly later, most around the 5th century. While the early community seems to have lived primarily as wandering monks who begged for alms, many Vinaya rules assume settled monasticism to be the norm, along with regular collective meals organized by lay donors or funded by monastic wealth.

The earliest dates that can be established for most Vinaya texts are the 5th century Chinese translations. The earliest established dates of the Theravada Vinaya stem from the composition of Buddhaghosa's commentaries in the 5th century and became known to Western scholarship through 17th- and 18th-century manuscripts.

The Mūlasarvāstivāda Vinaya was brought to the Tibetan Empire by Śāntarakṣita (d. 788) by c. 763, when the first monks were ordained there, and was translated into Chinese by the 8th century. Earlier Sanskrit manuscripts date to the 5th to 7th centuries. Scholarly consensus places the composition of the Mūlasarvāstivāda Vinaya in the early centuries of the first millennium. However, all the manuscripts and translations are relatively late.

== Overview ==
The core of the Vinaya is a set of rules known as the Pāṭimokkha in Pāli and the Prātimokṣa in Sanskrit. This is the shortest portion of every Vinaya, and universally regarded as the earliest. This collection of rules is recited by the gathered Sangha at the new and full moon. Rules are listed in descending order, from the most serious (four rules that entail expulsion), followed by five further categories of more minor offences.

Most traditions include an explicit listing of rules intended for recitation, called the Prātimokṣa-sutra. In the Theravada tradition, the Pāṭimokkha rules appear in writing only alongside their exegesis and commentary, the Suttavibhaṅga or Vibhaṅga. While the Prātimokṣa is preserved independent of the Vibhaṅga in many traditions, scholars generally do not believe that the rules it contains were observed and enforced without the context provided by an interpretive tradition, even in the early era- many of the exceptions and opinions of the Vibhanga seem to stem from older customs regarding what was and wasn't permissible for wandering ascetics in the Indian tradition.

The second major component of the Vinaya is the Suttavibhaṅga, which provides commentary on each of the rules listed in the Prātimokṣa. This typically includes the origin of the rule in a specific incident or dispute, along with variations that indicate related situations covered by the rule, as well as exceptions that account for situations that are not to be regarded as violations of a more general rule.

The third division of the Vinaya is known as the Vinayavastu, Skandhaka, or Khandhaka, meaning 'divisions' or 'chapters'. Each section of these texts addresses a specific aspect of monastic life, including procedures and regulations for ordination, the acquisition and storage of medical supplies, and the procurement and distribution of robes. The final segment of this division, the Kṣudrakavastu ("minor division"), contains miscellanea that do not belong to other sections, and in some traditions is so large that it is treated as a separate work. Strong agreement between multiple different recensions of the Skandhaka across different traditions and languages with respect to the number of chapters (generally 20) and their topics and contents has led scholars to the conclusion that they must stem from a common origin.

Parallel and independent Prātimokṣa rules and Vibhangas exist in each tradition for bhikkhus and bhikkhunis. The majority of rules for monastics are the same, but the bhikkhuni Prātimokṣa and Vibhaṅga includes additional rules that are specific to women, including the controversial Eight Garudhammas, whose authorship is not attributed to the Buddha. In the Pali text, a specific chapter of the Khandhaka deals with issues pertaining specifically to women renunciants, and the Mulasarvastivada tradition devotes most of one of the two volumes of its Ksudrakavastu to matters related to women.

Beyond this point, the distinct Vinaya traditions differ in their organization. The Pali Vinaya includes a text known as the Parivāra that presents a question-and-answer format that recapitulates various rules in different groupings, along with various analyses. The Chinese texts include two sections not found in the Pali tradition, the Niddanas and Matrkas that have counterparts in the Tibetan tradition's Uttaragrantha. Relatively little analysis of these texts has been conducted, but they seem to contain an independent reorganization of the Vinaya rules that may be an earlier strata of texts.

== Texts ==
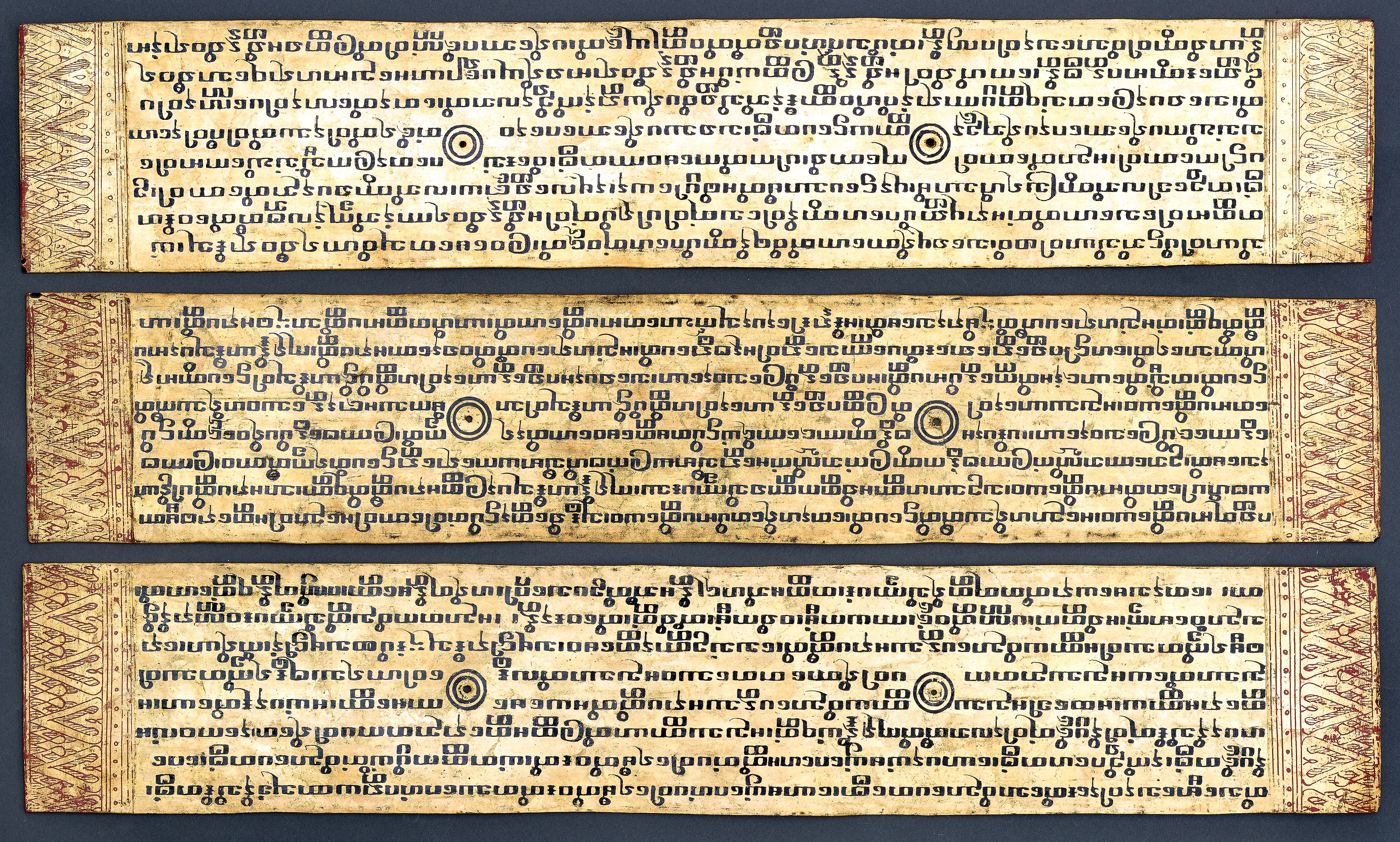
Manuscript of Vinaya Pitaka. Lacquered and gilded wood, gilded palm leaves. Myanmar, 1856. Palazzo Madama, Torino

=== Theravada Vinaya ===
The Theravāda Vinaya is preserved in the Pāli Canon called the Vinaya Piṭaka.

- Suttavibhaṅga: Pāṭimokkha and commentary
  - Mahāvibhaṅga: rules for monks
  - Bhikkhunīvibhaṅga: rules for nuns
- Khandhaka: 22 chapters on various topics
- Parivāra: analyses of rules from various points of view

=== Mūlasarvāstivāda Vinaya ===
The Mūlasarvāstivāda Vinaya (Sanskrit; Tibetan: འདུལ་བ་, Wylie: ‘Dul ba; Chinese: 根本說一切有部律; pinyin: Gēnběn shuō yīqiè yǒu bùlǜ) (T. 1442), a translation from the Mūlasarvāstivāda school, extant in both the Tibetan Buddhist canon in the Kangyur, in a Chinese edition, and in an incomplete Sanskrit manuscript. This is the version used in Tibetan Buddhism. It comprises seven major works and may be divided into four traditional sections.

- Vinayavastu (Tibetan: འདུལ་བ་གཞི, Wylie: dul ba gzhi): 17 skandhakas (chapters)
- Vinayavibhaṅga
  - Prātimokṣasūtra (སོ་སོར་ཐར་པའི་མདོ་ so sor thar pa‘i mdo): rules for monks
  - Vinayavibhaṅga (འདུལ་བ་རྣམ་འབྱེད་ ‘dul ba rnam ‘byed): explanations on rules for monks
  - Bhikṣunīprātimokṣasūtra (དགེ་སློང་མའི་སོ་སོར་ཐར་པའི་མདོ་ dge slong ma‘i so sor thar pa‘i mdo): rules for nuns
  - Bhikṣunīvinayavibhaṅga (དགེ་སློང་མའི་འདུལ་བ་རྣམ་པར་འབྱེད་པ་ dge slong ma‘i ‘dul ba rnam par ‘byed pa): explanations on rules for nuns
- Vinayakṣudrakavastu (འདུལ་བ་ཕྲན་ཚེགས་ཀྱི་གཞི་ ‘dul ba phran tshegs kyi gzhi): miscellaneous topics
- Vinayottaragrantha (འདུལ་བ་གཞུང་བླ་མ་ ‘ba gzhung bla ma): appendices, including the Upāliparipṛcchā, which corresponds to a chapter of the Parivāra.
  - Vinayottaragrantha (འདུལ་བ་གཞུང་དམ་པ་ ‘dul ba gzhung dam pa): a second, more comprehensive version of the above

=== Dharmaguptaka Four Part Vinaya ===
The Four Part Vinaya (Sanskrit: Cāturvargīya-vinaya; Chinese: 四分律; pinyin: Sìfēn lǜ; Wade–Giles: Ssŭ-fen lü) (T. 1428). This is Chinese translation of the Dharmaguptaka version and is used in the Chinese tradition and its derivatives in Korea, Vietnam and in Japan under the early Kokubunji temple system. In the case of Japan, this was later replaced with ordination based solely on the Bodhisattva Precepts.

- Bhikṣuvibhaṅga: rules for monks
- Bhikṣunīvibhaṅga (明尼戒法): rules for nuns
- Skandhaka (犍度): of which there are 20
- Samyuktavarga
  - Vinayaikottara, corresponding to a chapter of the Parivara

=== Other surviving Vinayas ===
Three other Vinaya collections survive in Chinese translation.

Various complete vinaya texts are preserved in the Chinese Buddhist canon (see: Taishō Tripiṭaka), and these include:

- Mahīśāsaka Vinaya (T. 1421)
- Mahāsāṃghika Vinaya (T. 1425)
- Dharmaguptaka Vinaya (T. 1428)
- Sarvāstivāda Vinaya (T. 1435)
- Mūlasarvāstivāda Vinaya (T. 1442)

Six complete versions are extant. Fragments of the remaining versions survive in various languages.

==== Ten Recitation Vinaya ====
The Ten Recitation Vinaya (Sanskrit: Daśa-bhāṇavāra-vinaya; Chinese: 十誦律; pinyin: Shísònglǜ; Wade–Giles: Shisong lü) (T. 1435), a Chinese translation of the Sarvāstivāda version

  - Bhikṣuvibhaṅga
  - Skandhaka
  - Bhikṣunīvibhaṅga
  - Ekottaradharma, similar to Vinayaikottara
  - Upaliparipriccha
  - Ubhayatovinaya
  - Samyukta
  - Parajikadharma
  - Sanghavasesha
  - Kusaladhyaya

==== Five Part Vinaya ====
The Five Part Vinaya (Sanskrit: Pañcavargika-vinaya; Chinese: 五分律; pinyin: Wǔfēnlǜ; Wade–Giles: Wu-fen-lü) (T. 1421), a Chinese translation of the Mahīśāsaka version

  - Bhikṣuvibhaṅga
  - Bhikṣunīvibhaṅga
  - Skandhaka

==== Mahāsāṃghika-vinaya ====
The Mahāsāṃghika-vinaya (Chinese: 摩訶僧祇律; pinyin: Móhēsēngqílǜ; Wade–Giles: Mo-ho-seng-ch'i lü) (T. 1425), a Chinese translation of Mahāsāṃghika version. An English translation of the bhikṣunī discipline is also available.

  - Bhikṣuvibhaṅga
  - Bhikṣunīvibhaṅga
  - Skandhaka

== Traditions ==
=== Theravada ===
Buddhism in Myanmar, Cambodia, Laos, Sri Lanka, and Thailand largely followed the Theravadin Vinaya, which has 227 rules for bhikkhus and 311 for bhikkhunis.

However, since the nun's lineage died out in all areas of the Theravada school, traditionally women's roles as renunciates were limited to taking eight or ten Precepts. Such women appear as maechis in Thai Buddhism, dasasīlamātās in Sri Lanka, thilashin in Myanmar and sīladharās at Amaravati Buddhist Monastery in England.

More recently, Theravadin women have been undergoing upasampadā again, although this is a highly charged topic within Theravadin communities.

=== East Asian Buddhism ===
Buddhists in China, Korea, Taiwan and Vietnam follow the Dharmaguptaka Vinaya (四分律), which has 250 rules for the bhikkhus and 348 rules for the bhikkhunis. Some schools in Japan technically follow this, but many monks there are married, which can be considered a violation of the rules. Other Japanese monks follow the Bodhisattva Precepts only, which was excerpted from the Mahāyāna version of Brahmajālasutra (梵網經). And the Bodhisattva Precepts contains two parts of precepts: for lay and clergy. According to Chinese Buddhist tradition, one who wants to observe the Bodhisattva Precepts for clergy, must observe the Ten Precepts and High Ordination [Bhikkhu or Bhikkhunī Precepts] first.

=== Tibetan Buddhism ===
Tibetan Buddhists in Tibet, Bhutan, Mongolia, Nepal, Ladakh and other Himalayan regions follow the Mūlasarvāstivāda Vinaya, which has 253 rules for the bhiksus (monks) and 364 rules for bhiksunis (nuns). In addition to these pratimokṣa precepts, there are many supplementary ones.

The Tibetan Buddhist tradition of fully ordained bhikṣuṇī nuns officially recommenced in Bhutan on 23 June 2022, when 144 women were ordained. According to Nyingma school and Kagyu school scholars, the full ordination lineage of bhikkhuni for nuns within the Mūlasarvāstivāda Vinaya was transmitted in Tibet by Shantarakshita, but did not survive the later persecution of Tibetan Buddhists undertaken by Udum Tsenpo. Afterwards, Tibetan nuns were getsunma (Tib. novice) nuns (Skt. śramaṇerīs) only, after taking the lay vows of eight or ten Precepts, see ordination of women in Buddhism.

== Vinaya school ==
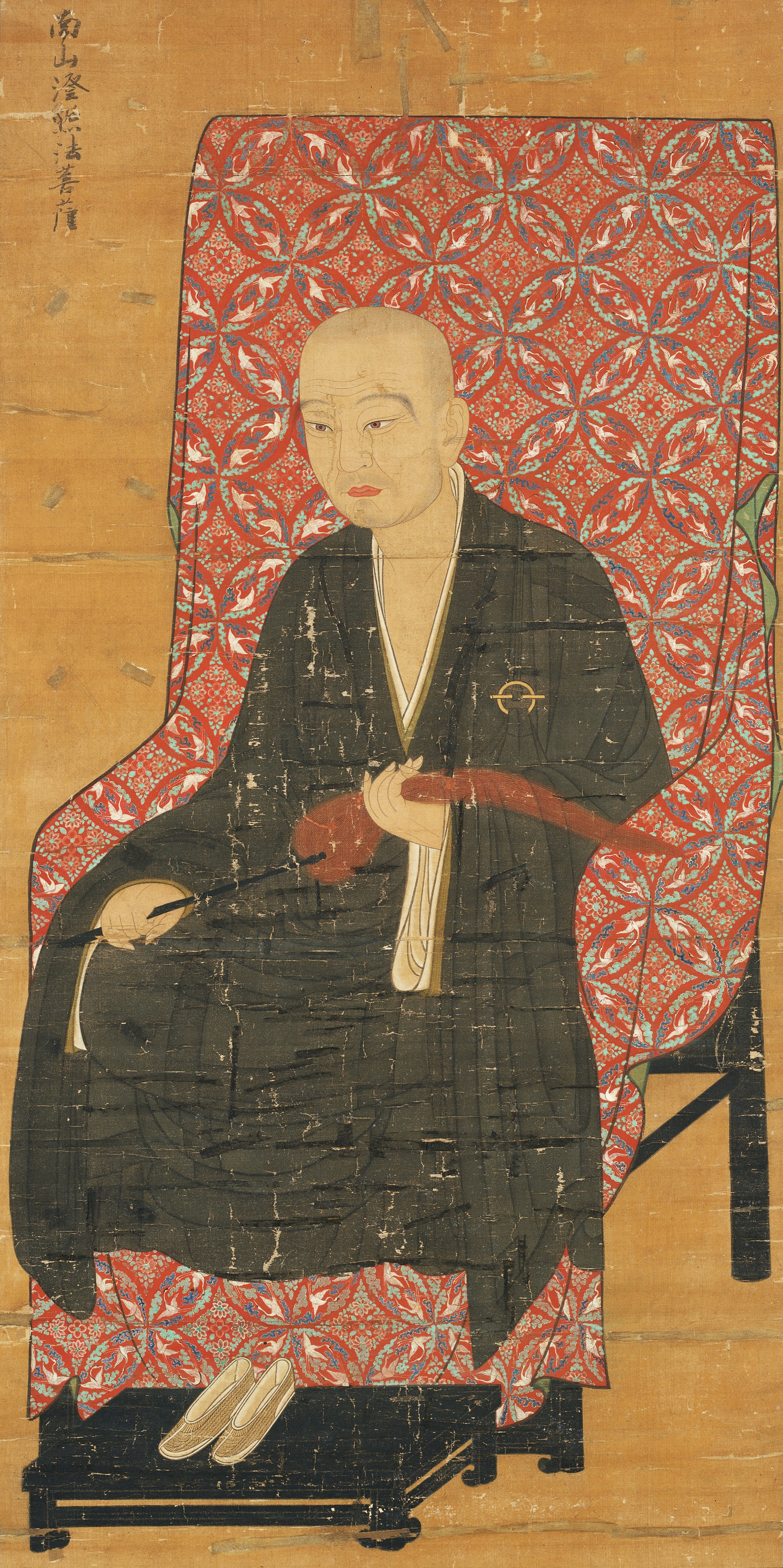
Daoxuan (7th century), the founder of the Chinese Nanshan lineage of the Chinese Vinaya school

The Vinaya School (C. Lü zong; J. Risshū; K. Yul chong 律宗) was a significant current in the early transmission and institutionalization of Buddhism in East Asia. Centered on the study and practice of the monastic disciplinary codes (Sanskrit: vinaya; Chinese: 戒律 jielü), this tradition emphasized the rigorous observance of precepts as the foundational path to liberation. It became one of the thirteen major schools (shisanzong 十三宗) in China, recognized for its distinct doctrinal and institutional focus on monastic discipline.

Among the several Vinaya texts transmitted to China, the Four-Part Vinaya (Sifen lü 四分律) of the Dharmaguptaka school gained predominant authority. Translated into Chinese in 405 CE by the Kashmīri monk Buddhayaśas, this text outlined a disciplinary code of 250 rules for monks and 348 for nuns. The Four-Part Vinaya formed the textual basis for later doctrinal exegesis and monastic regulation across East Asia. The most influential lineage of this tradition in China came to be known as the Southern Mountain School (Nanshan lü zong 南山律宗), named after the Zhongnanshan (South Mountain) region where its founder, the eminent Vinaya master Daoxuan 道宣 (596–667), resided. His authoritative commentary on the Four-Part Vinaya, the Sifen lü shanfan buque xingshi chao (compiled in 626), became the central text of the school and provided detailed guidance on monastic procedures and ritual regulations. This exegesis established the Nanshan School as the dominant tradition of Vinaya interpretation in China.

Daoxuan theorized the teaching of the Vinaya as part of Buddhist soteriology, with a strong emphasis on ethical action. While the term "Vinaya school" appeared in his time, Daoxuan mainly saw it as referring to the scholastic teaching rather than a sectarian division. He would have found it strange if the Vinaya was observed and studied only by a single branch. Daoxuan took a syncretic approach, supplementing parts of the Dharmaguptaka Vinaya with other Vinayas and actively seeking a connection between Mahāyāna and Hīnayāna teachings. His works became the dominant and authoritative interpretation in China, partly due to Tang imperial court support. Most later commentaries focused on interpreting Xingshichao. The Dharmaguptaka Vinaya became the core concept of the Nanshan Vinaya school.

Despite the prominence of the Nanshan lineage, two other major Vinaya traditions were active during the early Tang period: the Xiangbu zong 相部宗 led by Fali 法礪 (569–635), and the Dongta zong 東塔宗 (East Pagoda School) led by Huaisu 懷素 (624–697). These schools also offered their own readings and practices based on alternative Vinaya texts, though they eventually faded in influence relative to the Nanshan system.

The period after the fall of the Tang saw a resurgent interest in the commentarial tradition of the Dharmaguptaka Vinaya. Yuanzhao (1048–1116), a Northern Song Vinaya master, is a pivotal figure in this period. His reinterpretation of Daoxuan's commentaries inspired monastic revival movements in medieval China and Japan. Through the efforts of Yuanzhao and his disciples, the teaching of the Vinaya eventually acquired an institutional presence in Song China. Around Yuanzhao's time, there was a boom in sub-commentaries on Daoxuan's Xingshichao. Yuanzhao became highly influential, unifying the interpretation of Daoxuan, and is designated as the Resurgent Patriarch of the Vinaya school. The institutional formation of the Vinaya school is essentially based on Yuanzhao's teaching. Yuanzhao initiated the effort to construct a lineage tracing back to India, composing the Lineage of Nanshan Vinaya School which places Dharmaguptaka as the first patriarch and Daoxuan as the ninth. Yuanzhao's teachings were characterized by a synthetic approach, notably combining the Vinaya and Pure Land Buddhism. He saw receiving precepts as the beginning of the path and aspiring to rebirth in the Pure Land as the end. He integrated Pure Land belief into the conferral ritual. He focused on jieti (戒體), the "essence of precepts", as a central concept of the school. Yuanzhao defended Daoxuan's position on the nature of jieti, linking it to the "school of emptiness" and bridging Hīnayāna and Mahāyāna teachings. Yuanzhao criticized the lack of Vinaya understanding among monastics in his time, noting that their education often neglected it in favor of scriptures, treatises, and Chan. Records from the Southern Song indicate the Vinaya school had institutional infrastructure, attracting wide patronage from lay people and the royal family. The printing of Vinaya texts in the Southern Song was a campaign involving multiple parties and patronage, demonstrating national recognition and stabilization of the school.

In modern Chinese Buddhism, Master Hongyi is a key figure in the revival of the Vinaya school. He is recognized by later generations as the 11th patriarch of the Nanshan Vinaya School. Hongyi initially studied the Mūlasarvāstivāda Vinaya but later shifted his focus to the Nanshan Vinaya school, partly influenced by Xu Weiru and recognizing its historical role in Chinese Buddhism. He vowed to promote the Nanshan Vinaya teachings that he felt had been largely neglected for over 700 years. Master Hongyi's contributions to the Vinaya school are significant. He compiled, edited, revised, and collated Vinaya texts, providing essential resources for study. He wrote commentaries and annotations on the Four-division Vinaya and the works of Daoxuan and Yuanzhao. Notably, he authored Nanshanlü zaijia beilan (南山律在家備覽) to help lay Buddhists understand precepts. He actively promoted the Vinaya through lectures and established Vinaya schools/academies to train monastics. Hongyi insisted on the importance of keeping precepts as the correct path and emphasized the Vinaya within the context of the Three Studies (precepts, meditative concentration, wisdom). He developed views on classifying and distinguishing Vinaya doctrines. While his status as the 11th patriarch faced some debate from other traditions like the Baohuashan sect, he is widely regarded as a patriarch who reinvigorated the Nanshan school.

In Korea, the tradition was transmitted under the name Gyeyul Jong 戒律宗, primarily through the efforts of the monk Jajang 慈藏. In Japan, the tradition became known as Risshū 律宗, established by the Chinese monk Jianzhen 鑑眞 (Japanese: Ganjin; 687–763). Ganjin's transmission of the Nanshan Vinaya interpretations significantly shaped the development of early Japanese Buddhism, particularly during the Nara period. The Risshū became one of the six Nara schools (Nanto Rokushū), and was later counted among the thirteen schools of Japanese Buddhism.

== Role in Mahāyāna Buddhism ==
The Mahāyāna Bodhisattvabhūmi, part of the Yogācārabhūmi Śāstra, regards it an offense for monastics following the Mahāyāna to reject the traditional rules of the Vinaya:

If he thinks or says, "A future buddha has nothing to do with learning or observing the law of the Vehicle of the Śrāvakas," he commits a sin of pollution (kliṣṭā āpatti).

Louis de La Vallée-Poussin wrote that the Mahāyāna relies on traditional full ordination of monastics, and in doing so is "perfectly orthodox" according to the monastic vows and rules of the early Buddhist traditions:

From the disciplinary point of view, the Mahāyāna is not autonomous. The adherents of the Mahāyāna are monks of the Mahāsāṃghika, Dharmaguptaka, Sarvāstivādin and other traditions, who undertake the vows and rules of the bodhisattvas without abandoning the monastic vows and rules fixed by the tradition with which they are associated on the day of their Upasampad [full ordination].

=== De-emphasis of Vinaya in Chan ===
The Vimalakīrti Sūtra, an oft-cited and important text in Chan Buddhism, contains an account of two monks who felt great shame for having violated the Vinaya. As such, they sought out for repentance the monk Upāli, foremost in discipline among Buddha's disciples and famous to tradition for reciting the Vinaya at the First Buddhist Council. Upāli undertook to explain the manner by which they might be pardoned for their transgressions, but was chastised by the lay bodhisattva Vimalakīrti for troubling the monks' minds even further. Vimalakīrti explains that the nature of the monks' transgressions "does not reside within, it does not reside without, and it does not reside in the middle," going on to state that those who understand the non-abiding mirage-like nature of dharmas are called "upholders of the Vinaya." The Zhengdao ge, famously attributed to Yongjia Xuanjue (665–713), comments on this episode, describing those who "merely understand that grave offenses obstruct bodhi" as dull and stubborn. The text compares Upāli's wisdom to the light of a mere firefly, while praising Vimalakīrti for removing the monks' doubts "The way the hot sun melts frost and snow."

The Long Scroll, containing the earliest known records of Chan Buddhism, also has the iconoclastic Master Yuan criticizing attitudes which attach to and reify the letter of the Buddhist disciplinary code. In an encounter between Yuan and a Dharma Master Chih, which anticipates the dialogues of the later recorded-sayings genre, Chih confronts Yuan for being on the butchers' lane in the marketplace, as it is a violation of the Buddhist precepts for monks to witness the slaughter of animals. When Chih expresses his outrage that Yuan has seen the slaughtering of sheep, Yuan responds, "You're seeing it on top of seeing it!" Here Yuan points out that Chih has reified both the seeing of the slaughter and the violation of the disciplinary code. According to Jorgensen, Yuan is concerned with the spirit rather than the letter of the Buddhist precepts, echoing teachings found in the Prajñāpāramitā sutras, for example: "non-renunciation of moral training consists in the non-observation of all moral duties." The Long Scroll also explains that one who "breaks the precepts and commits murder, commits sexual crimes and thievery, and fears falling into a hell" will be liberated upon seeing their own "Dharma King," comparing this to one who commits mortal crimes being pardoned by a monarch, thereby avoiding the anxiety of a death sentence.

The early Chan movement known as the Baotang School, founded by the Chan master Wuzhu (714–774), was criticized by Guifeng Zongmi (780–841) for its radical antiformalism which included a rejection of such things as taking precepts, performing repentance rituals, reading sutras, and keeping buddha images. According to Yanagida Seizan, Wuzhu's unique interpretation of wunian (no-thought) implied a radical rejection of all Buddhist ritual and placed no formal restraints on religious life. This is exemplified by Wuzhu's refusal to perform the traditional ceremony of conferring the Buddhist precepts when accepting new members to the Buddhist order. In an encounter with a group of Vinaya masters, Wuzhu says, "the precepts are not blue, yellow, red, or white. Not color/desire and not mind, this is the substance of precepts, this is the fundamental nature of beings, fundamentally complete, fundamentally pure." He defines violating the Vinaya precepts as producing deluded thoughts, while not producing deluded thoughts fulfills the precepts, going on to state, "When thoughts are not produced, this is precisely Vinayottara [the supreme Vinaya]; when thoughts are not produced, this is precisely Vinayaviniścaya [the definitive determination of the Vinaya]." For Wuzhu, "precepts" and "not-precepts" are a single characteristic. It is in this wise that Wuzhu offers the following criticism of Vinaya masters:

These days Vinaya Masters preach about [sense] 'contact' and preach about 'purity,' preach about 'upholding' and preach about 'violating.' They make forms for receiving the precepts, they make forms for decorum, and even for eating food—everything is made into forms. 'If one makes forms, then one is the same as non-Buddhist [practitioners of] the five supramundane powers. If one does not make forms, this is precisely the unconditioned. One ought not have views.'

The Oxhead Chan text known as the Jueguan lun similarly declares, "To talk about offense and precepts is setting up subjective value judgments—hence, it is biased and not the true Way." The text gives the examples of Mañjuśrī and Aṅgulimāliya, who raised weapons against Śākyamuni, but who, perceiving the unborn principle and realizing the emptiness of all phenomena, were nonetheless in accord with the Way. The Jueguan lun describes such realization as being free of arguments concerning "offense" or "no offense." In the tenth chapter of the same text it is further explained how a bodhisattva may take evil as the path if they do not discriminate good and evil. Here it is stated that for one whose mind is like a field fire burning a hill, a gale uprooting trees, a landslide burying beasts, or flood water drowning insects, then killing will be possible. The text goes on to make similar statements for stealing, sexual indulgence, and lying. Henrik Sorensen observes that Oxhead texts such as the Xin Ming and Jueguan lun contain concepts commonly found in Daoism, such as non-doing (wuwei), and the valuation of spontaneity (ziran) over the Vinaya. Similarly, in his analysis of the Xinxin Ming, famously attributed to the third Chan patriarch Sengcan (d. 606?), Dusan Pajin writes that the text aligns with the Chan tendency, influenced by Daoism, "to stress spontaneity, at the expense of rules, or discipline."

Chan sources from the Song dynasty such as the Song gaoseng zhuan and the Jingde Chuandenglu credit the establishment of Chan as an independent institution to the famous Tang era master Baizhang Huaihai (720–814). According to these accounts, it was Baizhang who was the first to create a distinctly Chan code of monastic regulations and thus "deliberately established a 'separate Chan monastery' that would not follow Vinaya rules." Jinhua Jia observes that according to these sources, Baizhang's regulations emphasized that no Buddha hall was to be built, and mentioned neither scriptural study nor Buddhist ritual. As such, Baizhang has been remembered as an iconoclast by Chan tradition since the Song dynasty. However, no text of Baizhang's monastic code presently exists, and the earliest extant Chan monastic code, known as the Chanyuan qinggui (Rules of purity for Chan monasteries), was compiled in 1103 by Changlu Zongze. Although Chan tradition regards Zongze's text to be based on the earlier regulations of Baizhang, as Carl Bielefeldt observes, "Despite Po-chang's [Baizhang's] fame as the creator of an independent Zen monastic system, and despite repeated references in the literature to the 'Pure Regulations of Po-chang' (Po-chang ch'ing-kuei), there is little evidence that this monk actually produced a written code and still less that it survived to Tsung-tse's [Zongze's] time."

During the periods of the Southern Song dynasty (1127–1280) and the Yuan dynasty (1260–1368) several more texts of monastic regulations were produced, and in 1333 the monk Dongyang Dehui appealed to the imperial court to authorize the compilation of a unified monastic code to reconcile various discrepancies. Dehui's text, known as the Baizhang Zen Monastic Regulations (Revised under the Yuan Imperial Edict), subsequently received state sanction for enforcement in all Chan monasteries. Shohei Ichimura obseves that introducing secular authority into religious affairs in this way "may have gradually set the stage for the growth of extreme formalism within the tradition, thereby stifling spontaneous spiritual expression."

=== Critical attitudes toward precepts in Japanese Zen ===
Examples also exist in Japanese Zen of masters who de-emphasized the precepts. During the Kamakura period in Japan, the master Nōnin (died c. 1194–1195), founder of the early Japanese Zen sect known as the Daruma School, declared himself to be a self-enlightened Zen master after abandoning the traditional Tendai establishment. Nōnin's Daruma School was criticized in the Kōzen gokokuron by Eisai (1141–1215), founder of the Japanese Rinzai tradition, which states that "they [the Daruma-shū adepts] themselves say that there are no precepts to follow, no practices to engage in. From the outset there are no passions; from the beginning we are enlightened. Therefore do not practice, do not follow the precepts, eat when hungry, rest when tired. Why practice nembutsu, why give maigre feasts, why curtail eating?"

Additionally, in the Muromachi period, the Zen master Ikkyū (1394–1481) saw sex in light of the nonduality of desire and bodhi, taking it as a spiritual practice and means to test his sense of enlightenment as well. So serious was Ikkyū that sex was a religious rite that he insisted on wearing monk's robes when entering brothels. Toward the end of his life, Ikkyū told his disciples, "After my death some of you will seclude yourselves in the forests and mountains to meditate, while others may drink saké and enjoy the company of women. Both kinds of Zen are fine, but if some become professional clerics, babbling about 'Zen as the way,' they are my enemies."

The Tokugawa master Bankei Yōtaku (1622–1693) is perhaps most famous for his unique teaching of the Unborn. In an encounter with a master of the Ritsu sect, the Japanese Vinaya school, he said:

...for the man who abides in the Unborn Buddha Mind, there's no need for precepts. The precepts were taught to help sentient beings—they weren't taught to help buddhas! What everyone has from his parents innately is the Unborn Buddha Mind alone, so abide in the Unborn Buddha Mind. When you abide in the Unborn Buddha Mind, you're a living buddha here today, and that living buddha certainly isn't going to concoct anything like taking the precepts, so there aren't any precepts for him to take. To concoct anything like taking the precepts is not what's meant by the Unborn Buddha Mind. When you abide in the Unborn Buddha Mind, there's no way you can violate the precepts. From the standpoint of the Unborn, the precepts too are secondary, peripheral concerns; in the place of the Unborn, there's really no such thing as precepts.

== See also ==
- First Buddhist Council
- Second Buddhist Council
- Schools of Buddhism

== Bibliography ==
- Horner, I.B. (1970). The book of discipline Vol. I (Suttavibhaṅga), London Luzac, reprint.
- Horner, I.B. (1957). The book of discipline Vol. II (Suttavibhaṅga), London Luzac.
- Horner, I.B. (1957). The book of discipline Vol. III (Suttavibhaṅga), London Luzac.
- Horner, I.B. (1962). The book of discipline Vol. IV (Mahāvagga), London Luzac. 1. publ., reprint, Oxford: Pali Text Society 1993.
- Horner, I.B. (1963). The book of discipline Vol. V (Cullavagga), London Luzac.
- Horner, I.B. (1966). The book of discipline Vol. VI (Parivāra), London Luzac.
- Ichimura, Shōhei (2006). "The Baizhang Zen monastic regulations", Berkeley, Calif: Numata Center for Buddhist Translation and Research, ISBN 1-886439-25-7.
- Jayawickrama, N.A., trans. (1962). Inception of discipline and the Vinaya-Nidana, Sacred books of the Buddhists Vol. XXI, London Luzac. (Buddhagosas Samantapasadika, the Vinaya commentary)
- Pruden, Leo M. (1995). "The essentials of the Vinaya tradition", by Gyōnen, Berkeley, Calif: Numata Center for Buddhist Translation and Research, ISBN 0-9625618-9-4.
- Rhys Davids, T. W.; Oldenberg, Hermann, trans. (1881–85). Vinaya Texts, Sacred Books of the East, volumes XIII, XVII & XX, Clarendon/Oxford. Reprint: Motilal Banarsidass, Delhi (Dover, New York) Vol. XIII, Mahavagga I–IV, Vol. XVII, Mahavagga V–X, Kullavagga I–III, Vol. XX, Kullavagga IV–XII
- Singh, Upinder (2016), A History of Ancient and Early Medieval India: From the Stone Age to the 12th Century, Pearson, ISBN 978-81-317-1677-9
- "原始佛教聖典之集成－第三節 結論毘尼藏的組織".
