= Parivāra =

- SuttaCentral; OpenTipitaka
- Type: Canonical text
- Parent: Vinaya Piṭaka
- Attribution: Bhāṇaka
- Aṭṭhakathā: Samantapāsādikā (Parivāra-aṭṭhakathā)
- Commentator: Buddhaghosa
- Ṭīkā: Sāratthadīpanī; Vajirabuddhi; Vimativinodanī
- Abbreviation: Pvr

Parivāra (Pāli for "accessory") is the third and last book of the Theravādin Vinaya Pitaka. It includes a summary and multiple analyses of the various rules identified in the Vinaya Pitaka's first two books, the Suttavibhanga and the Khandhaka, primarily for didactic purposes. Because it includes a long list of teachers in Ceylon, scholars, and Theravada fundamentalists, in its present form some suggest the work may be written later than the Fourth Council in Ceylon in the last century BCE, when the Pali Canon was written down from oral tradition.

== Overview ==
The book contains 19 chapters:

1. catechisms on the rules of the monks' Patimokkha
2. similar on the nuns' rules
3. verse summary of origins; an action can be originated by body and/or speech, in each of the three cases with or without intention, making six origins in all; this chapter goes through all the Patimokkha rules for monks and nuns, saying which of these six are possible
4. in two parts:
  1. repetitions on types of legal case involved in offences
  2. which rules for settling disputes are to be applied to legal cases
5. questions on Khandhaka
6. lists arranged numerically (cf. Anguttara Nikaya)
7. in two parts:
  1. beginning the recitation of the Patimokkha
  2. exposition of reasons for rules
8. collection of stanzas
9. on legal cases
10. additional collection of stanzas (mainly on reproving)
11. on reproving
12. lesser collection on disputes
13. greater collection on disputes
14. kathina: the process of making up robes
15. Upali asks the Buddha questions, the answers being lists of five
16. another chapter on origins
17. second (sic) collection of stanzas
18. "sweat-inducing stanzas": a collection of riddles (answers not given here); perhaps intended as exam questions"
19. in five parts:
  1. formal acts of the sangha
  2. reasons for rules
  3. laying down of rules
  4. what was laid down
  5. nine classifications

== Translations ==
- The Book of the Discipline, tr I. B. Horner, volume VI, 1966, Pali Text Society, Oxford.

== See also ==
- Vinaya Pitaka
