= Vinaya Piṭaka =

First division of the Tripitaka or Pali Canon of Theravada Buddhism

- SuttaCentral; OpenTipitaka
- Type: Canonical collection
- Parent: Tipiṭaka
- Contains: Suttavibhaṅga; Khandhaka; Parivāra
- Aṭṭhakathā: Samantapāsādikā (Vinayapiṭaka-aṭṭhakathā)
- Commentator: Buddhaghosa
- Ṭīkā: Sāratthadīpanī; Dvemātikā; Vinayasaṅgaha; Vajirabuddhi; Vimativinodanī; Vinayālaṅkāra; Kaṅkhāvitaraṇīpurāṇa; Vinayavinicchaya; Pācityādiyojanā; Khuddasikkhā; Mūlasikkhā
- Abbreviation: Vinaya; Vin; Vi

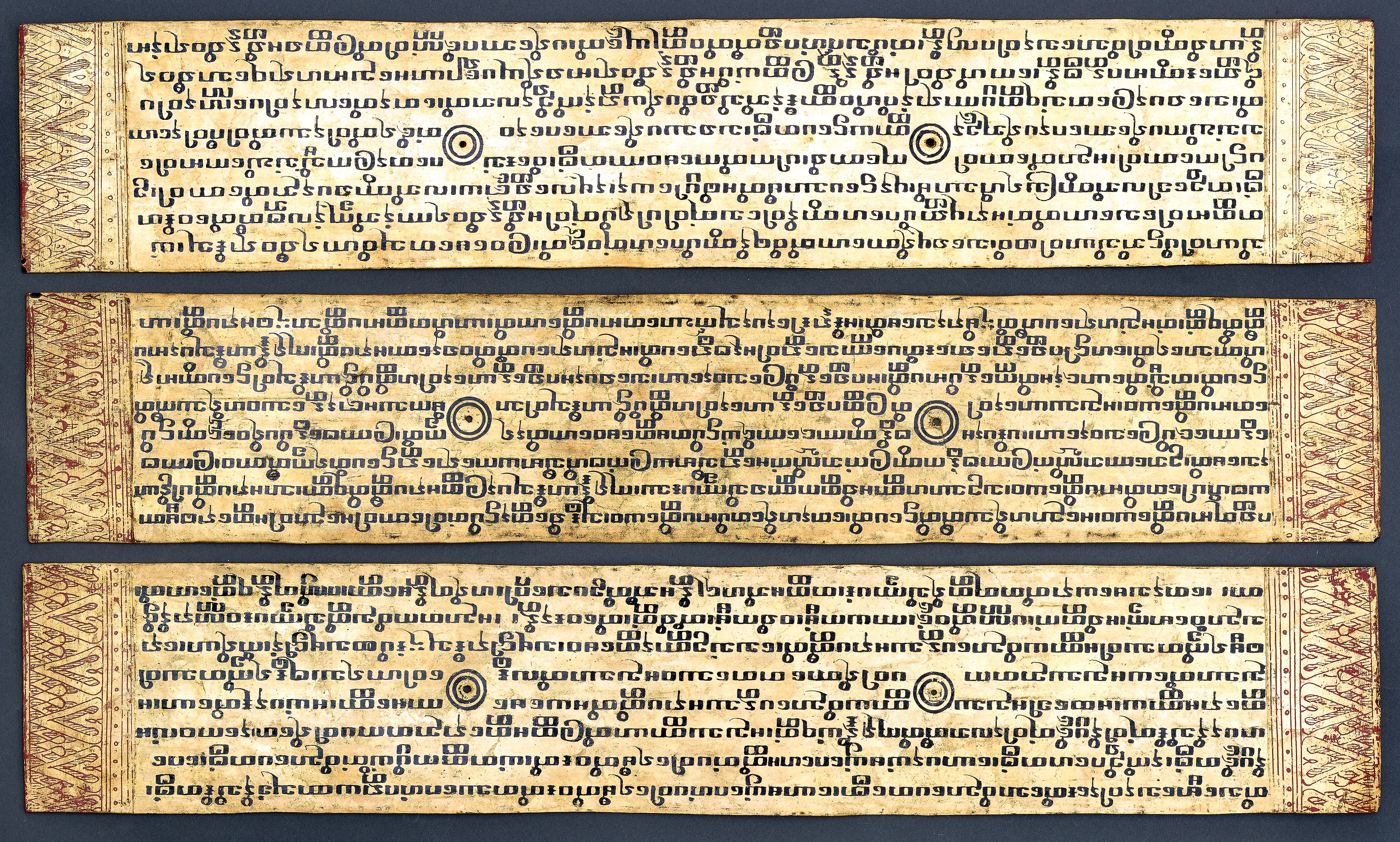
Three folios from the palm-leaf manuscript of Vinaya Pitaka made in Myanmar in the year 1856. Palazzo Madama, Turin

The Vinaya Piṭaka (English: Basket of Discipline) is the first of the three divisions of the Pali Tripitaka, the definitive canonical collection of scripture of Theravada Buddhism. The other two parts of the Tripiṭaka are the Sutta Piṭaka and the Abhidhamma Piṭaka. Its primary subject matter is the monastic rules of conduct for monks and nuns of the Sangha.

== Origins ==
According to tradition, the Tripiṭaka was compiled at the First Council shortly after the Buddha's death. The Vinaya Piṭaka is said to have been recited by Upāli, with little later addition. Most of the different versions are fairly similar, most scholars consider most of the Vinaya to be fairly early, that is, dating from before the separation of schools.

== Contents ==
The Pāli Vinaya consists of:

- Suttavibhaṅga: Pāṭimokkha and commentary
  - Mahāvibhaṅga: rules for monks
  - Bhikkhunīvibhaṅga: rules for nuns
- Khandhaka: 22 chapters on various topics
- Parivāra: analyses of rules from various points of view

The Pali version of the Patimokkha contains 227 rules for bhikkhus and 311 rules for bhikkhunis. The Vibhaṅga sections consist of commentary on these rules, giving detailed explanations of them along with the origin stories for each rule. The Khandhaka section gives numerous supplementary rules grouped by subject that also consist of origin stories.

== Place in the tradition ==
According to the sutras, in the first years of the Buddha's teaching the sangha lived together in harmony with no vinaya, as there was no need, because all of the Buddha's early disciples were highly realized if not fully enlightened. As the sangha expanded, situations arose which the Buddha and the lay community felt were inappropriate for mendicants.

The first rule to be established was the prohibition against sexual intercourse. The origin story tells of an earnest monk whose family was distraught that there was no male heir and so persuaded the monk to impregnate his former wife. All three—the monk, his wife and son, the latter of whom later ordained—eventually became fully enlightened arhats.

The Buddha called his teaching the "Dhamma-Vinaya", emphasizing both the philosophical teachings of Buddhism as well as the training in virtue that embodies that philosophy. Shortly before his death, the Buddha clarified to his disciples through Ānanda:

Now, Ānanda, if it occurs to any of you—"The teaching has lost its arbitrator; we are without a Teacher"—do not view it in that way. Whatever Dhamma and Vinaya I have pointed out and formulated for you, that will be your Teacher when I am gone.

— Mahāparinibbāna Sutta, (DN 16)

== See also ==
- Abhidhamma Pitaka
- Access to Insight
- Buddhist Publication Society
- Dhamma Society Fund
- List of suttas
- Pāli Canon
- Pali Text Society
- Pariyatti (bookstore)
- Sutta Piṭaka
- Vinaya
- Upāli

== Literature ==
- Davids, T. W. Rhys, Oldenberg, Hermann (joint tr): Vinaya texts, Oxford, The Clarendon press 1881. Vol.1 Vol.2 Vol.3 Internet Archive
