= Mahākassapa (12th century) =

12th-century Sri Lankan monk

Mahākassapa Thera was a 12th-century Sri Lankan forest monk and an abbot of Dimbulagala Raja Maha Vihara, a forest monastery outside of Polonnaruwa. Mahākassapa who was well versed in Vinaya, presided over the Buddhist council convened by King Parakramabahu I (1153–1186) whose main goal was to reorganize, reform and unify the Sangha. An inscription at Gal Vihara states that with Mahākassapa's advice, the council expelled hundreds of corrupt monks and unified the Sangha under one single monastic Nikaya, the Mahavihara sect. Mahākassapa also wrote several works on Vinaya.
