= Samantapasadika =

Samantapāsādikā
- OpenTipitaka
- Type: Commentarial text
- Parent: Aṭṭhakathā
- Commentary on: Vinaya Piṭaka (Suttavibhaṅga; Khandhaka; Parivāra)
- Composition: c. 5th century
- Attribution: Buddhaghosa
- Ṭīkā: Sāratthadīpanī-ṭīkā (Mahāvagga-ṭīkā, Cūḷavagga-ṭīkā); Vajirabuddhi-ṭīkā; Vimativinodanī-ṭīkā; Vinayālaṅkāra-ṭīkā
- Abbreviation: Sp

Samantapāsādikā (also spelled Samantapāsādika) is a commentary (Aṭṭhakathā) on the Vinaya Pitaka of the Theravada Tipitaka. It was composed by Buddhaghosa in the 5th century CE, based primarily on the Sinhalese Mahā-aṭṭhakathā (Great Commentary), with references also to the Mahāpaccarī and Kurundī commentaries.

Many of the verses in the Samantapāsādikā are borrowed from the older Dīpavaṃsa (3rd–4th century CE). The title derives from "samanta" (meaning "all around, in every direction") and "pāsādika" (meaning "lovely, pleasing").

In addition to commentary on the Vinaya, the Samantapāsādikā preserves important records on the social, political, ethical, religious, and philosophical history of ancient India. According to Oskar von Hinüber, it also incorporates verses from the Dīpavaṃsa and reflects the textual milieu of early Sri Lanka.

A sub-commentary (ṭīkā) on the work is the Sāratthadīpanī, composed by Ācariya Sāriputta Thera of Sri Lanka during the reign of King Parakkamabāhu I (1153–1186 CE).

The Samantapāsādikā was also translated into Chinese in 489 CE by the monk Sanghabhadra. It remains part of the curriculum in the Thai monastic education system at the level of Pali Studies, Grade 6 (Parian Tham 6).

== Origins ==
Buddhaghosa composed the Samantapāsādikā at Anurādhapura, Sri Lanka, between 927 and 973 BE (384–430 CE), at the request of the elder Buddhasiha, during the reign of King Siripala. In the introduction, Buddhaghosa explains that this was the first commentary he composed on the Tipiṭaka, beginning with the Vinaya rather than the Sutta, since the Vinaya is the foundation of the Buddhist dispensation.

This perspective reflects the text’s own narrative of the First Buddhist Council, where Mahākassapa and the assembled monks began their recitation with the Vinaya, declaring it “the life of the Buddha’s dispensation.”

== Contents ==
The Samantapāsādikā is divided into three parts:

- Part 1: Commentary on the Veranja-khandhaka to the Pārājika-khandhaka of the Mahāvibhaṅga (monastic rules for monks).
- Part 2: Commentary on the Terasaka-khandhaka to the Aniyata-khandhaka of the Mahāvibhaṅga, the Nissaggiya-khandhaka to the Adhikaraṇasamatha-khandhaka of the second Mahāvibhaṅga, and the Bhikkhunī-vibhaṅga (rules for nuns).
- Part 3: Commentary on the Mahāvagga, Cullavagga, and Parivāra, including accounts of the Saṅgha’s origins, regulations, activities, Q&A sections, and councils.

In brief, the text covers both:

- Doctrinal Vinaya content: origins of the first four councils, qualities of the Buddha, mindfulness, concentration, analytical knowledge, consciousness, faculties, and monastic rules for monks and nuns.
- Historical records: including accounts of King Aśoka, King Ajātaśatru, King Udayabhadda, King Anuruddha, and King Muṇḍa, along with descriptions of famines, ancient cities (e.g., Kusinārā, Campā, Sāvatthī), and references to Suvaṇṇabhūmi.

== Significance ==
Beyond its doctrinal commentary, the Samantapāsādikā is an important historical source for Indian Buddhism. It records the Buddhist councils, including the Third Council under King Aśoka, and describes missionary activity sent to various regions. It also documents the classification of the Buddhist texts into the three Piṭakas: the Vinaya Pitaka, Sutta Pitaka, and Abhidhamma Pitaka.
