= Khandhaka =

2nd book of the Pāli Vinaya Pitaka

- SuttaCentral Khandhaka OpenTipitaka: Mahāvagga; Cūḷavagga
- Type: Canonical text
- Parent: Vinaya Piṭaka
- Contains: Mahāvagga; Cūḷavagga
- Attribution: Bhāṇaka
- Aṭṭhakathā: Samantapāsādikā (Mahāvagga-aṭṭhakathā, Cūḷavagga-aṭṭhakathā)
- Commentator: Buddhaghosa
- Ṭīkā: Sāratthadīpanī; Vajirabuddhi; Vimativinodanī
- Abbreviation: Kd; Mv; Cv

Khandhaka is the second book of the Theravadin Vinaya Pitaka and includes the following two volumes:

- Mahāvagga: includes accounts of Gautama Buddha's and the ten principal disciples' awakenings, as well as rules for uposatha days and monastic ordination.
- Cullavagga: includes accounts of the First and Second Buddhist councils and the establishment of the community of bhikkhunis, as well as rules for addressing offenses within the sangha (monastic community).

== Origins ==
According to tradition, the Khandhaka was compiled at the first council, mentioned in the text, with the account of the first council added at the second and that of the second at the third. Scholars do not take this literally, but differ as to how far they disagree with it. Professor Erich Frauwallner argued in 1956 that the original version of this book was compiled at the second council, and this theory is still taken seriously by many scholars. For further scholarly opinions see Vinaya Pitaka and Pāli Canon.

== Outline ==
The Mahavagga has 10 chapters:

1. the first chapter is simply called the great chapter; it starts with a narrative beginning immediately after the Buddha's enlightenment and telling of the beginning of his preaching and foundation of the order of monks; it goes on to give rules on ordination and related matters
2. the second deals with the recitation of the Patimokkha, which is to take place every half month (at new and full moons) wherever there is a quorum of four monks
3. then comes provision for the retreat for three months in the rainy season, when monks are supposed to stay in one place except for specified reasons
4. at the end of the retreat they must invite their colleagues to say if they have any criticisms of their behaviour
5. the fifth chapter is called the chapter on hides and deals with various topics
6. the next chapter is on medicines; a passage authorizing inhalation of smoke through a tube is used by some modern monks to justify smoking
7. the next chapter is called kathina, the process of making monastic robes, but is in fact about the exemptions granted monks from certain rules in consequence of this
8. robe material
9. a dispute between monks at Campa
10. a dispute at Kosambi

The Cullavagga has 12 chapters:

1. the first deals with various procedures to be followed in dealing with badly behaved monks
2. the next deals with probation for monks guilty of certain offences (see Suttavibhanga)
3. the next chapter deals with the case where a monk on probation commits a further offence
4. explanation of the seven rules for settling disputes (see Suttavibhanga)
5. minor matters
6. lodgings
7. schism; this chapter starts with the story of Devadatta, the Buddha's fellow clansman; he starts by inviting the elderly Buddha to retire and appoint him in his place; when this is refused he makes three attempts to assassinate the Buddha; when these fail he asks the Buddha to impose strict practices, including vegetarianism, on the monks; when this is refused he leads a schism
8. observances; various duties
9. a monk may suspend the recitation of the Patimokkha if another monk has an offence unconfessed
10. nuns; the Buddha, after being asked seven times, finally agrees to establish an order of nuns, but warns that it will weaken the teaching and shorten its lifetime, and imposes some rules organizing nuns' orders (more on this can be found in the Pali Canon, most notably the Kunala Jataka; for the other side see Therigatha)
11. shortly after the Buddha's death, Kassapa holds a council at which the teachings are recited; Upali answers questions on the vinaya and Ananda on the dhamma
12. a century later a dispute arises on various points, mainly on the acceptance of gold and silver; another council is held which agrees on the stricter position, after receiving advice from an aged pupil of Ananda

== Translations ==
- Vinaya Texts, tr T. W. Rhys Davids & Hermann Oldenberg, Sacred Books of the East, volumes XIII, XVII & XX, Clarendon/Oxford, 1881-5; reprinted Motilal Banarsidass, Delhi (&? Dover, New York) Vol. XIII, Mahavagga I-IV, Vol. XVII, Mahavagga V-X, Kullavagga I-III, Vol. XX, Kullavagga IV-XII
- The Book of the Discipline, parts 4 & 5, tr I. B. Horner, Oxford 1951-2, Pali Text Society.

== See also ==
- First Buddhist Council
- Second Buddhist Council
- Sangha
- Bhikkhuni
- Vinaya Pitaka
- Sutta Pitaka
- Abhidhamma Pitaka
