= Chakravarthi Ram-Prasad =

Professor

Chakravarthi Ram-Prasad, FBA is the Distinguished Professor of Comparative Religion and Philosophy at Lancaster University. His research focuses on Indian religions – Hinduism, Buddhism and Jainism – and comparative phenomenology, epistemology, metaphysics and philosophy of religion. His studies include the conceptual roots of contemporary beliefs, politics and conflict in religious context, and the religious identities of South Asian diaspora in the United Kingdom. He was elected as a Fellow of the British Academy in 2017. In 2026 he became Vice-President (Humanities) at the British Academy.

== Education ==
Ram-Prasad is an alumnus of Sri Sathya Sai Institute, and earned a masters and a doctorate in philosophy from the University of Oxford.

== Career and Work ==
Ram-Prasad is Distinguished Professor of Comparative Religion and Philosophy in the School of Global Affairs at Lancaster University. He was the Associate Dean for Research, Faculty of Arts and Social Sciences (2009–14) and Deputy Dean of the Faculty (2024-26). He has been a regular contributor to the BBC Radio 4's Beyond Belief and Sunday Programme in the United Kingdom. He has been a member of Council of Research England, UKRI since 2021, and a member of the Academic Panel of the Leverhulme Trust likewise.

Ram-Prasad has published seven books and nearly sixty peer-reviewed articles on Indian religions, comparative religions (Hindu-Christian, Buddhism in India and China), contemporary Indian politics and religion, multiculturalism and British society, and comparative political philosophy. His studies have included religious literature in Sanskrit, Pali and Tamil.

In a review of Ram-Prasad's award-winning book Divine Self, Human Self based on the Bhagavad Gita, the Cambridge University scholar Ankur Barua states, "Ram-Prasad skilfully engages Śaṁkara and Rāmānuja in conversations over classical Vedantic themes of selfhood, being, and agency" to exegetically and hermeneutically explain how these two influential Hindu scholars interpreted the same text to reach two views of Self (Atman) in Hindu philosophy.

== Honours ==
His book "Divine Self, Human Self" was the winner of the Best Book 2011–15, by the Society for Hindu Christian Studies.

In July 2017, Ram-Prasad was elected a Fellow of the British Academy (FBA), the United Kingdom's national academy for the humanities and social sciences, and since 2026 has been its Vice-President (humanities).

== Selected publications ==
Books

- Knowledge and Liberation in Classical Indian Thought (Palgrave, 2001), ISBN 978-1-4039-1373-9
- Advaita Epistemology and Metaphysics: An outline of Indian non-realism (Routledge, 2002), ISBN 978-1-3150-2939-9
- Eastern Philosophy (Weidenfeld and Nicolson, 2005)
- Ram-Prasad, Chakravarthi (2006). India : life, myth and art. Duncan Baird. ISBN 1844832872., which has been translated into French, Polish and Finnish
- Ram-Prasad, Chakravarthi (2007). Indian philosophy and the consequences of knowledge : themes in ethics, metaphysics and soteriology. Aldershot, England. ISBN 9780754686767.
- Ram-Prasad, Chakravarthi (2013). Divine self, human self : the philosophy of being in two Gita commentaries. Bloomsbury. ISBN 978-1441176813.

Human Being, Bodily Being. Phenomenology from Classical India. Oxford: Oxford University Press

- Irina Kuznetsova; Jonardon Ganeri; Chakravarthi Ram-Prasad (2016). Hindu and Buddhist Ideas in Dialogue: Self and No-Self. Routledge. ISBN 978-1-317-12193-0.

Some Journal articles and chapters

- Ram-Prasad, Chakravarthi (1995). "A Classical Indian Philosophical Perspective on Ageing and the Meaning of Life". Ageing and Society. 15 (1). Cambridge University Press: 1–36. doi:10.1017/s0144686x00002105. S2CID 145798344.
- Ram-Prasad, C. (2000). "Knowledge and Action I: Means to the Human End in Bhātta Mīmāmsā and Advaita Vedānta". Journal of Indian Philosophy. 28 (1). Springer Nature: 1–24. doi:10.1023/a:1004744313963. S2CID 170635199.
- Ram-Prasad, C. (2000). "Knowledge and Action II: Means to the Human End in Bhātta Mīmāmsā and Advaita Vedānta". Journal of Indian Philosophy. 28 (1). Springer Nature: 25–41. doi:10.1023/a:1004776719414. S2CID 171038504.
- Ram-Prasad, C. (2000). "Hindu Nationalism and the International Relations of India". Religion and International Relations. Palgrave Macmillan UK. pp. 140–197. doi:10.1057/9781403916594_7. ISBN 978-1-349-27846-6.
