= Anuradhapura Maha Viharaya =

Theravada Buddhist monastery Sri Lanka

Coordinates: 8°20′41″N 80°23′48″E

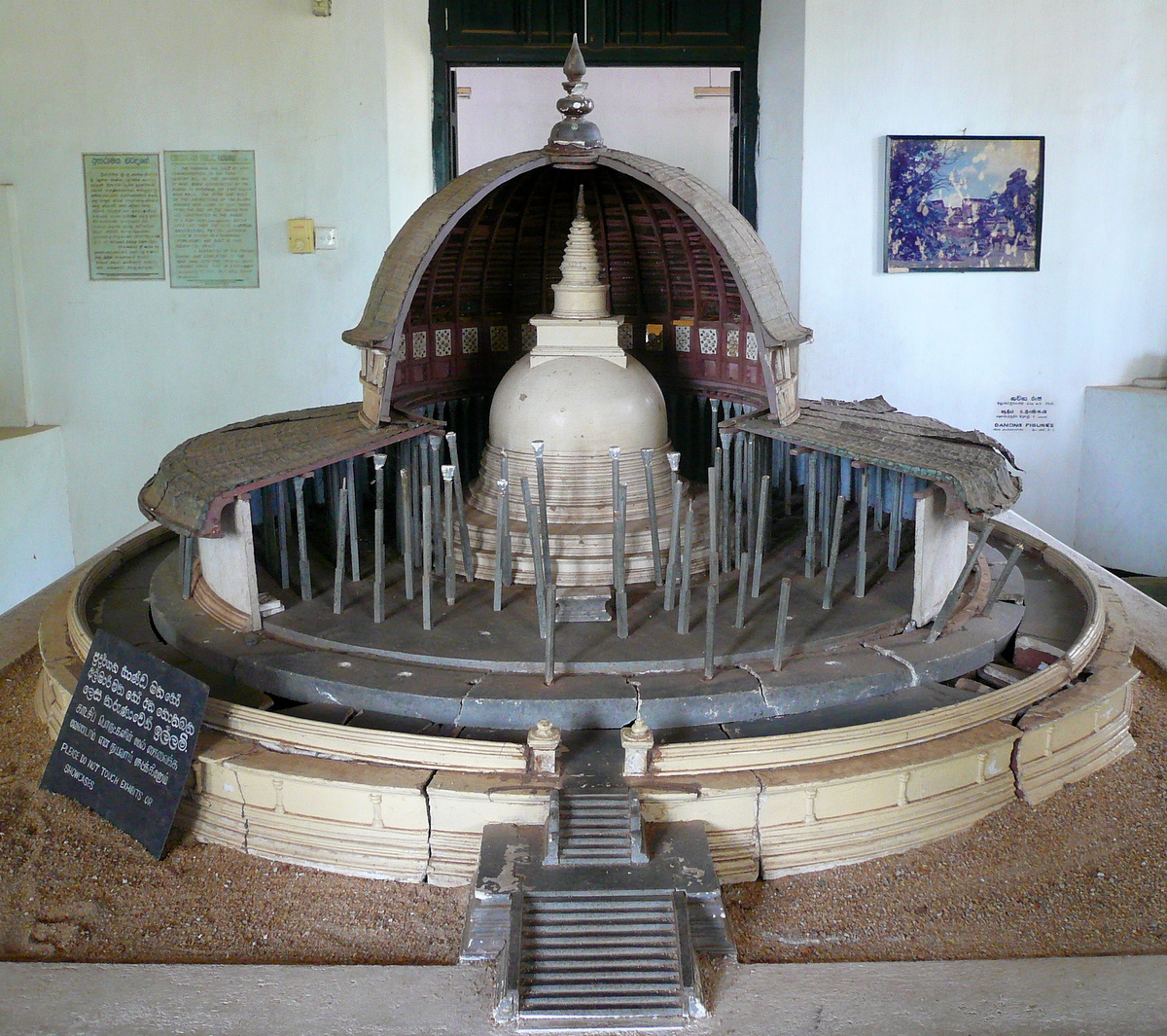
Model of the Thuparama stupa, the first Sri Lankan stupa, which was part of the Mahavihara complex

The Anuradhapura Maha Viharaya was an important mahavihara or large Buddhist monastery for Theravada Buddhism in Sri Lanka. King Devanampiya Tissa of Anuradhapura (247–207 BCE) founded it in his capital city of Anuradhapura. Monks such as Buddhaghosa (4th to 5th century CE) and Dhammapala, who wrote commentaries on the Tipitaka and texts such as the Visuddhimagga, which are central to Theravada Buddhist doctrine, established Theravada Mahāvihāra of the Tambapaṇṇiya (Pali; Sanskrit: Tāmraparṇīya or Tāmraśāṭīya) orthodoxy here. The monks residing at the Mahāvihāra came to be known as the Mahāvihāravāsins.

In the 5th century, the Mahāvihāra was likely the most advanced center of learning in southern or eastern Asia. It attracted numerous international scholars, who studied a wide range of disciplines under a highly structured system of instruction.

== Theravada monastic groups ==
=== Early history ===
During much of the early history of Buddhism in Sri Lanka, three major subdivisions developed: the Mahāvihāra, the Abhayagiri Vihāra, and Jetavana Vihāra. The Mahāvihāra was the earliest tradition, while the Abhayagiri and Jetavana traditions were later established by monks who separated from it. According to A.K. Warder, the Indian Mahīśāsaka sect also took root in Sri Lanka alongside Theravāda, before eventually being absorbed into it. At various points, the northern regions of the island appear to have been ceded to sects originating from India.

According to Mahavamsa, the Anuradhapura Mahāvihāra was destroyed in the 4th century during sectarian conflicts with the monks of the Abhayagiri Vihāra. These Mahayana-oriented monks are said to have incited King Mahasena of Anuradhapura to demolish the Mahāvihāra. In response, a later ruler expelled the Mahāyānists from Sri Lanka..

The traditional Theravadin account provided by the Mahavamsa stands in contrast to the writings of the Chinese Buddhist monk Faxian, who journeyed to India and Sri Lanka in the early 5th century (between 399 and 414 CE). He first entered Sri Lanka around 406 CE and began writing about his experiences in detail. He recorded that the Mahāvihāra was not only intact, but housed 3000 monks. He also provides an account of a cremation at Mahāvihāra that he personally attended of a highly respected śramaṇa who attained the arhatship. Faxian also recorded the concurrent existence of the Abhayagiri Vihāra, and that this monastery housed 5000 monks. In the 7th century CE, Xuanzang also describes the concurrent existence of both monasteries in Sri Lanka. Xuanzang wrote of two major divisions of Theravāda in Sri Lanka, referring to the Abhayagiri tradition as the "Mahāyāna Sthaviras," and the Mahāvihāra tradition as the "Hīnayāna Sthaviras". Xuanzang further writes, "The Mahāvihāravāsins reject the Mahāyāna and practice the Hīnayāna, while the Abhayagirivihāravāsins study both Hīnayāna and Mahāyāna teachings and propagate the Tripiṭaka."

=== Later history ===
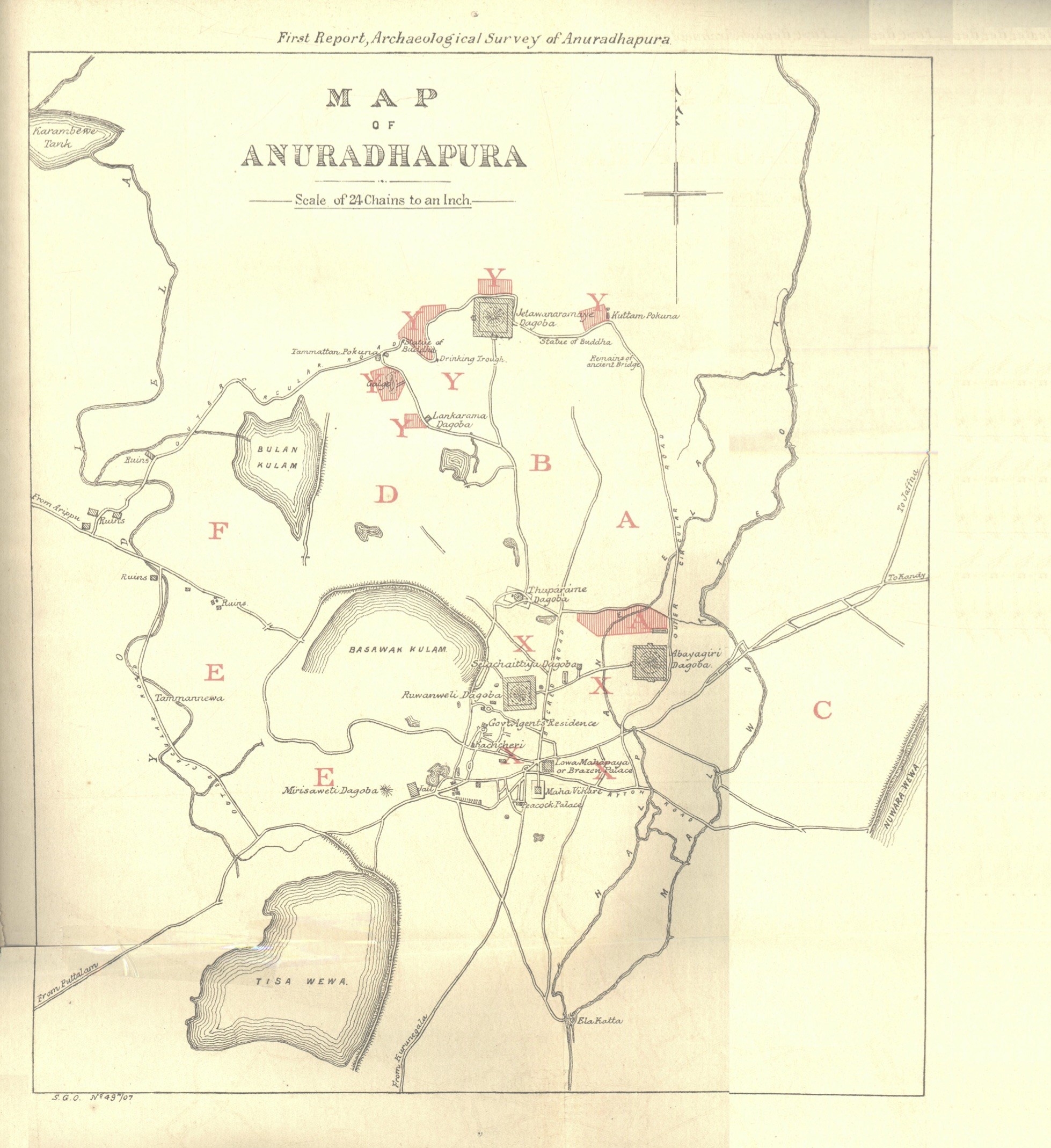
1890 map of Anuradhapura by Harry Charles Purvis Bell showing the location of the Mahavihara

Some scholars have held that the rulers of Sri Lanka ensured that Theravāda remained traditional, and that this characteristic contrasts with Indian Buddhism. However, before the 12th century CE, more rulers of Sri Lanka gave support and patronage to the Abhayagiri Theravādins, and travelers such as Faxian saw the Abhayagiri Theravādins as the main Buddhist tradition in Sri Lanka.

The trend of Abhayagiri Vihara being the dominant Theravāda sect changed in the 12th century CE, when the Mahāvihāra gained the political support of King Parakramabāhu I (1153-1186 CE), and completely abolished the Abhayagiri and Jetavana Theravāda traditions. The Theravāda monks of these two traditions were subsequently derobed and faced the choice of either returning permanently to lay life or seeking re-ordination within the Mahāvihāra tradition, but only at the level of novices (sāmaṇera). Richard Gombrich writes that many monks from the Mahāvihāra were also derobed:
