= Suttavibhaṅga =

First book of the Vinaya Pitaka of Pali Canon

- SuttaCentral (Bu); SuttaCentral (Bi); SuttaCentral (Bu #); SuttaCentral (Bi #); OpenTipitaka (Bu Pj–Bu Np); OpenTipitaka (Bu Pc–Bu As; Bi Pj–Bi As)
- Type: Canonical text
- Parent: Vinaya Piṭaka
- Contains: Bhikkhuvibhaṅga (Pārājikapāḷi, Pācittiyapāḷi); Bhikkhunīvibhaṅga
- Attribution: Bhāṇaka
- Aṭṭhakathā: Samantapāsādikā (Pārājikakaṇḍa-aṭṭhakathā, Pācittiya-aṭṭhakathā)
- Commentator: Buddhaghosa
- Ṭīkā: Sāratthadīpanī; Vajirabuddhi; Vimativinodanī
- Abbreviation: Bu; Bi; Bhikkhuvibhaṅga: Bu Pj; Bu Ss; Bu Ay; Bu Np; Bu Pc; Bu Pd; Bu Sk; Bu As; Bhikkhunīvibhaṅga: Bi Pj; Bi Ss; Bi Np; Bi Pc; Bi Pd; Bi Sk; Bi As

Suttavibhanga (-vibhaṅga, Pali for "rule analysis") is the first book of the Theravadin Vinaya Pitaka. It is a commentary on the community rules (Patimokkha). The general form of the commentary is that each rule is preceded by a story telling how the Buddha came to lay it down, and followed by explanations. Sometimes this includes further stories acting as "judicial precedents". It is divided into two parts, covering the rules for monks and nuns, respectively. The monks' rules are divided as follows:

- 4 rules whose breach entails expulsion from the community; the traditional understanding is that the offender cannot be a monk again in this life, though he can in most cases become a novice
  - sexual intercourse; the introductory narrative includes some unrelated material, including a story of how Sariputta asks the Buddha which previous Buddhas' teachings lasted a long time and why; the Buddha's answer is that the teaching of those Buddhas who taught scriptures and rules of discipline lasted (cf. Max Weber's doctrine of routinization); the rule makes provision for a monk to leave the order and return to lay life, during which "breaches" of this rule would not count and he could be reordained later (customs on this vary; in Southeast Asia reordination is common, but in Sri Lanka it is not; the permission to leave the order does not apply to nuns)
  - stealing, as defined by the authorities; according to the Suttavibhanga, this includes tax evasion; it also gives stories of monks who, motivated by compassion, released animals from hunters' traps, the Buddha declaring them not guilty
  - killing a human being, or encouraging one to die; according to the Suttavibhanga this includes abortion
  - fraudulent claims to spiritual attainments
- 13 rules whose breach requires a meeting of the community; the offender must serve first probation for as many days as elapsed between offence and confession, then five days of manatta discipline (Miss Horner leaves the term untranslated); he may then be rehabilitated, but only by a quorum of 20 monks
- 2 rules for dealing with matters that might fall into different categories
- 30 rules whose breach entails expiation and forfeiture of an improperly acquired or retained possession; the Suttavibhanga says in the first one that the forfeited item must be returned to the offending monk; the tradition holds that this applies to most of these rules; an exception is the rule against accepting gold and silver, which the Suttavibhanga interprets as applying to anything accepted in society as money
- 92 rules whose breach entails expiation; for some minor rules ignorance is not a defence, according to the Suttavibhanga; for example, in the rule forbidding eating after noon, it is no defence if the monk thought it was before noon; likewise, in the rule against drinking alcohol, it is no defence if the monk thought the drink was non-alcoholic
- 4 rules whose breach entails confession
- 75 rules for training
- 7 rules for settling disputes

The nuns' section has the same sections apart from the third. Since many of the nuns' rules apply to monks too and these are not usually repeated in the Suttavibhanga, the numbers of rules actually appearing in some sections of the nuns' analysis are less than the totals given at the beginning and end.

- 4 of 8 rules entailing expulsion
- 10 of 17 rules requiring a meeting; nuns must serve manatta for a half month
- 12 of 30 rules entailing forfeiture
- 96 of 166 rules entailing expiation
- 8 rules entailing confession
- the same 75 rules of training, with only the first and last written out
- the same 7 rules for settling disputes

== Translation ==
The Book of the Discipline, tr I. B. Horner, parts 1–3, Oxford 1938–40 Pali Text Society

== See also ==
- Patimokkha
- Sangha
- Vinaya Pitaka
