= Buddhaghosa =

Indian Theravadin Buddhist commentator, translator, and philosopher (c. 370–c. 450)

Personal life
- Born: c. 370 CE Bodh Gaya
- Died: c. 450 CE Anuradhapura Kingdom
- Education: Anuradhapura Maha Viharaya

Religious life
- Religion: Buddhism
- School: Theravāda

Buddhaghosa was a 5th-century Indian Theravādin Buddhist commentator, translator, and philosopher. He worked in the great monastery (mahāvihāra) at Anurādhapura, Sri Lanka and saw himself as being part of the Vibhajyavāda school and in the lineage of the Sinhalese mahāvihāra.

His best-known work is the Visuddhimagga ("Path of Purification"), a comprehensive summary of older Sinhala commentaries on the scriptural canon of the Theravāda school. According to Sarah Shaw, in Theravāda Buddhism this systematic work is "the principal text on the subject of meditation." The interpretations provided by Buddhaghosa have generally constituted the orthodox understanding of Theravādin scriptures since at least the 12th century CE.

Buddhaghosa is generally recognized by both Western scholars and Theravādin Buddhists as the most important philosopher and commentator of the Theravāda school.

== Name ==
The name Buddhaghosa means "Voice of the Buddha" (Buddha+ghosa) in Pāli, the language in which Buddhaghosa composed. In Sanskrit, the name would be spelled Buddhaghoṣa (Devanagari बुद्धघोष), but there is no retroflex ṣ sound in Pali, and the name is not found in Sanskrit works.

== Biography ==
Limited reliable information is available about the life of Buddhaghōsa. Three primary sources of information exist: short prologues and epilogues attached to Buddhaghosa's works; details of his life recorded in the Cūlavamsa, a Sri Lankan chronicle written in about the 13th century; and a later biographical work called the Buddhaghosuppatti. A few other sources discuss the life of Buddhaghosa, but do not appear to add any reliable material.

The biographical excerpts attached to works attributed to Buddhaghosa reveal relatively few details of his life, but were presumably added at the time of his actual composition. Largely identical in form, these short excerpts describe Buddhaghosa as having come to Sri Lanka from India and settled in Anuradhapura. Besides this information, they provide only short lists of teachers, supporters, and associates of Buddhaghosa, whose names are not generally to be found elsewhere for comparison.

Culavamsa, which is regarded as the second part of Mahavamsa and was written in around the thirteenth century, records that Buddhaghosa was born into a Brahmin family in the kingdom of Magadha. He is said to have been born near Bodh Gaya, and to have been a master of the Vedas, traveling through India engaging in philosophical debates. Only upon encountering a Buddhist monk named Revata was Buddhaghosa bested in debate, first being defeated in a dispute over the meaning of a Vedic doctrine and then being confounded by the presentation of a teaching from the Abhidhamma. Impressed, Buddhaghosa became a bhikkhu (Buddhist monk) and undertook the study of the Tipiṭaka and its commentaries. On finding a text for which the commentary had been lost in India, Buddhaghosa determined to travel to Sri Lanka to study a Sinhala commentary that was believed to have been preserved.

In Sri Lanka, Buddhaghosa began to study what was apparently a very large volume of Sinhala commentarial texts that had been assembled and preserved by the monks of the Anuradhapura Maha Viharaya. Buddhaghosa sought permission to synthesize the assembled Sinhala-language commentaries into a comprehensive single commentary composed in Pali. Traditional accounts hold that the elder monks sought to first test Buddhaghosa's knowledge by assigning him the task of elaborating the doctrine regarding two verses of the suttas; Buddhaghosa replied by composing the Visuddhimagga. His abilities were further tested when deities intervened and hid the text of his book, twice forcing him to recreate it from scratch. When the three texts were found to completely summarize all of the Tipiṭaka and match in every respect, the monks acceded to his request and provided Buddhaghosa with the full body of their commentaries.

Buddhaghosa went on to write commentaries on most of the other major books of the Pali Canon, with his works becoming the definitive Theravadin interpretation of the scriptures. Having synthesized or translated the whole of the Sinhala commentary preserved at the Anuradhapura Maha Viharaya, Buddhaghosa reportedly returned to India, making a pilgrimage to Bodh Gaya to pay his respects to the Bodhi Tree.

The details of the Mahavamsa account cannot readily be verified; while it is generally regarded by Western scholars as having been embellished with legendary events (such as the hiding of Buddhaghosa's text by the gods), in the absence of contradictory evidence it is assumed to be generally accurate. While the Mahavamsa claims that Buddhaghosa was born in northern India near Bodh Gaya, the epilogues to his commentaries make reference to only one location in India as being a place of at least temporary residence: Kanci in southern India. Some scholars thus conclude (among them Oskar von Hinüber and Polwatte Buddhadatta Thera) that Buddhaghosa was actually born in Amaravati, Andhra Pradesh and was relocated in later biographies to give him closer ties to the region of the Buddha.

The Buddhaghosuppatti, a later biographical text, is generally regarded by Western scholars as being legend rather than history. It adds to the Mahavamsa tale certain details, such as the identity of Buddhaghosa's parents and his village, as well as several dramatic episodes, such as the conversion of Buddhaghosa's father and Buddhaghosa's role in deciding a legal case. It also explains the eventual loss of the Sinhala originals that Buddhaghosa worked from in creating his Pali commentaries by claiming that Buddhaghosa collected and burnt the original manuscripts once his work was completed.

== Commentarial style ==
Buddhaghosa was reputedly responsible for an extensive project of synthesizing and translating a large body of ancient Sinhala commentaries on the Pāli Canon. His Visuddhimagga (Pāli: Path of Purification) is a comprehensive manual of Theravada Buddhism that is still read and studied today. Maria Heim notes that, while Buddhaghosa worked by using older Sinhala commentarial tradition, he is also "the crafter of a new version of it that rendered the original version obsolete, for his work supplanted the Sinhala versions that are now lost to us".

=== Writing style ===
Ñāṇamoli Bhikkhu writes that Buddhaghosa's work is "characterized by relentless accuracy, consistency, and fluency of erudition, and much dominated by formalism." According to Richard Shankman, the Visuddhimagga is "meticulous and specific," in contrast to the Pali suttas, which "can be vague at times, without a lot of explanatory detail and open to various interpretations."

=== Method ===
According to Maria Heim, Buddhaghosa is explicitly clear and systematic regarding his hermeneutical principles and exegetical strategies in his commentaries. He writes and theorizes on texts, genre, registers of discourse, reader response, Buddhist knowledge and pedagogy. Buddhaghosa considers each Pitaka of the Buddhist canon a kind of method (naya) that requires different skills to interpret. One of his most important ideas about exegesis of the buddha's words (buddhavacana) is that these words are immeasurable, that is to say, there are innumerable ways and modes to teach and explain the Dhamma and likewise there are innumerable ways in which to receive these teachings. According to Heim, Buddhaghosa considered the dhamma to be "well-spoken [...] visible here and now, timeless," visible meaning that the fruits of the path can be seen in the behavior of the noble ones, and that comprehending the dhamma is a transformative way of seeing, which has immediate impact. According to Heim, this idea of the transformative and immediate impact of the scriptures is "vital to Buddhaghosa's interpretative practice," concerned as he is with the immediate and transformative impact of the Buddha's words on his audiences, as attested in the suttas

Regarding his systematic thought, Maria Heim and Chakravarthi Ram-Prasad see Buddhaghosa's use of Abhidhamma as part of a phenomenological "contemplative structuring" which is expressed in his writings on Buddhist praxis. They argue that "Buddhaghosa’s use of nāma-rūpa should be seen as the analytic by which he understands how experience is undergone, and not his account of how some reality is structured."

=== Yogacara influences ===
Some scholars have argued that Buddhaghosa's writing evinces a strong but unacknowledged Yogācāra Buddhist influence, which subsequently came to characterize Theravada thought in the wake of his profound influence on the Theravada tradition. According to Kalupahana, Buddhaghosa was influenced by Mahayana-thought, which were subtly mixed with Theravada orthodoxy to introduce new ideas. According to Kalupahana, this eventually led to the flowering of metaphysical tendencies, in contrast to the original stress on anattā in early Buddhism. According to Jonardon Ganeri, though Buddhaghosa may have been influenced by Yogacara Vijñānavāda, "the influence consists not in endorsement but in creative engagement and refutation."

=== Theory of consciousness ===
The philosopher Jonardon Ganeri has called attention to Buddhaghosa's theory of the nature of consciousness and attention. Ganeri calls Buddhaghosa's approach a kind of "attentionalism", which places primacy on the faculty of attention in explaining activities of thought and mind and is against representationalism. Ganeri also states that Buddhaghosa's treatment of cognition "anticipates the concept of working memory, the idea of mind as a global workplace, subliminal orienting, and the thesis that visual processing occurs at three levels." Ganeri also states:

Buddhaghosa is unlike nearly every other Buddhist philosopher in that he discusses episodic memory and knows it as a reliving of experience from one’s personal past; but he blocks any reduction of the phenomenology of temporal experience to the representation of oneself as in the past. The alternative claim that episodic memory is a phenomenon of attention is one he develops with greater sophistication than has been done elsewhere.

Ganeri sees Buddhaghosa's work as being free from a mediational picture of the mind and also free of the Myth of the Given, two views he sees as having been introduced by the Indian philosopher Dignāga.

=== Meditation ===
The Visuddhimagga's doctrine reflects Theravada Abhidhamma scholasticism, which includes several innovations and interpretations not found in the earliest discourses (suttas) of the Buddha. Buddhaghosa's Visuddhimagga includes non-canonical instructions on Theravada meditation, such as "ways of guarding the mental image (nimitta)," which point to later developments in Theravada meditation. According to Thanissaro Bhikkhu, "the Visuddhimagga uses a very different paradigm for concentration from what you find in the Canon."

Bhante Henepola Gunaratana also notes that what "the suttas say is not the same as what the Visuddhimagga says [...] they are actually different," leading to a divergence between a [traditional] scholarly understanding and a practical understanding based on meditative experience. Gunaratana further notes that Buddhaghosa invented several key meditation terms which are not to be found in the suttas, such as "parikamma samadhi (preparatory concentration), upacara samadhi (access concentration), appanasamadhi (absorption concentration)." Gunaratana also notes that the Buddhaghosa's emphasis on kasina-meditation is not to be found in the suttas, where dhyana is always combined with mindfulness. (Note: See also Bronkhorst (1993), Two Traditions of Meditation in ancient India; Wynne (2007), The Origin of Buddhist Meditation; and Polak (2011), Reexamining Jhana)

Bhikkhu Sujato has argued that certain views regarding Buddhist meditation expounded in the Visuddhimagga are a "distortion of the Suttas" since it denies the necessity of jhana.

The Australian monk Shravasti Dhammika is also critical of contemporary practice based on this work. He concludes that Buddhaghosa did not believe that following the practice set forth in the Visuddhimagga will really lead him to Nirvana, basing himself on the postscript (colophon) to the text which states the author hopes to be reborn in heaven and wait until Metteyya (Maitreya) appears to teach the Dharma. (Note: Devotion to Metteya was common in South Asia from early in the Buddhist era, and is believed to have been particularly popular during Buddhaghosa's era.) However, according to the Burmese scholar Venerable Pandita, the colophon to the Visuddhimagga is not by Buddhaghosa.

According to Sarah Shaw, "it is unlikely that the meditative tradition could have survived in such a healthy way, if at all, without his detailed lists and exhaustive guidance." Yet, according to Buswell, by the 10th century vipassana was no longer practiced in the Theravada tradition, due to the belief that Buddhism had degenerated, and that liberation was no longer attainable until the coming of Maitreya. It was re-introduced in Myanmar (Burma) in the 18th century by Medawi (1728–1816), leading to the rise of the Vipassana movement in the 20th century, re-inventing vipassana-meditation and developing simplified meditation techniques, based on the Satipatthana sutta, the Visuddhimagga, and other previous texts, emphasizing satipatthana and bare insight.

== Attributed works ==
The Mahavamsa ascribes a great many books to Buddhaghosa, some of which are believed not to have been his work, but composed later and attributed to him. Below is a listing of the fourteen commentaries (Aṭṭhakathā) on the Pāli Canon traditionally ascribed to Buddhaghosa

Tipitaka			Buddhaghosa's commentary
from the Vinaya Pitaka	Vinaya (general)		Samantapasadika
from the Vinaya Pitaka	Patimokkha		Kankhavitarani
from the Sutta Pitaka	Digha Nikaya		Sumangalavilasini
from the Sutta Pitaka	Majjhima Nikaya		Papañcasūdanī
from the Sutta Pitaka	Samyutta Nikaya		Saratthappakasini
from the Sutta Pitaka	Anguttara Nikaya		Manorathapūraṇī
from the Sutta Pitaka	from the Khuddaka Nikaya	Khuddakapatha	Paramatthajotika (I)
from the Sutta Pitaka	from the Khuddaka Nikaya	Dhammapada	Dhammapadaṭṭhakathā
from the Sutta Pitaka	from the Khuddaka Nikaya	Sutta Nipata	Paramatthajotika (II), Suttanipata-atthakatha
from the Sutta Pitaka	from the Khuddaka Nikaya	Jataka	Jatakatthavannana, Jātakaṭṭhakathā
from the Abhidhamma Pitaka	Dhammasangani		Atthasālinī
from the Abhidhamma Pitaka	Vibhanga		Sammohavinodani
from the Abhidhamma Pitaka	Dhatukatha		Pañcappakaranatthakatha
from the Abhidhamma Pitaka	Puggalapaññatti		Pañcappakaranatthakatha
from the Abhidhamma Pitaka	Kathavatthu		Pañcappakaranatthakatha
from the Abhidhamma Pitaka	Yamaka		Pañcappakaranatthakatha
from the Abhidhamma Pitaka	Patthana		Pañcappakaranatthakatha

While traditional accounts list Buddhaghosa as the author of all of these works, some scholars hold that only the Visuddhimagga and the commentaries on the first four Nikayas as Buddhaghosa's work. Meanwhile, Maria Heim holds that Buddhaghosa is the author of the commentaries on the first four Nikayas, the Samantapasadika, the Paramatthajotika, the Visuddhimagga and the three commentaries on the books of the Abhidhamma.

Maria Heim also notes that some scholars hold that Buddhaghosa was the head of a team of scholars and translators, and that this is not an unlikely scenario.

== Influence and legacy ==
In the 12th century, the Sri Lankan (Sinhalese) monk Sāriputta Thera became the leading scholar of the Theravada following the reunification of the Sri Lankan (Sinhala) monastic community by King Parakramabahu I. Sariputta incorporated many of the works of Buddhaghosa into his own interpretations. In subsequent years, many monks from Theravada traditions in Southeast Asia sought ordination or re-ordination in Sri Lanka because of the reputation of the Sri Lankan (Sinhala) Mahavihara lineage for doctrinal purity and scholarship. The result was the spread of the teachings of the Mahavihara tradition — and thus Buddhaghosa — throughout the Theravada world. Buddhaghosa's commentaries thereby became the standard method by which the Theravada scriptures were understood, establishing Buddhaghosa as the definitive interpreter of Theravada doctrine.

In later years, Buddhaghosa's fame and influence inspired various accolades. His life story was recorded, in an expanded and likely exaggerated form, in a Pali chronicle known as the Buddhaghosuppatti, or "The Development of the Career of Buddhaghosa". Despite the general belief that he was Indian by birth, he later may have been claimed by the Mon people of Burma as an attempt to assert primacy over Sri Lanka in the development of Theravada tradition. Other scholars believe that the Mon records refer to another figure, but whose name and personal history are much in the mold of the Indian Buddhaghosa.

Finally, Buddhaghosa's works likely played a significant role in the revival and preservation of the Pali language as the scriptural language of the Theravada, and as a lingua franca in the exchange of ideas, texts, and scholars between Sri Lanka and the Theravada countries of mainland Southeast Asia. The development of new analyses of Theravada doctrine, both in Pali and Sinhala, seems to have dried up prior to Buddhaghosa's emergence in Sri Lanka. In India, new schools of Buddhist philosophy (such as the Mahayana) were emerging, many of them making use of classical Sanskrit both as a scriptural language and as a language of philosophical discourse. The monks of the Mahavihara may have attempted to counter the growth of such schools by re-emphasizing the study and composition in Pali, along with the study of previously disused secondary sources that may have vanished in India, as evidenced by the Mahavamsa. Early indications of this resurgence in the use of Pali as a literary language may be visible in the composition of the Dipavamsa and the Vimuttimagga, both dating to shortly before Buddhaghosa's arrival in Sri Lanka. The addition of Buddhaghosa's works — which combined the pedigree of the oldest Sinhala commentaries with the use of Pali, a language shared by all of the Theravada learning centers of the time — provided a significant boost to the revitalization of the Pali language and the Theravada intellectual tradition, possibly aiding the Theravada school in surviving the challenge to its position posed by emerging Buddhist schools of mainland India.

According to Maria Heim, he is "one of the greatest minds in the history of Buddhism" and British philosopher Jonardon Ganeri considers Buddhaghosa "a true innovator, a pioneer, and a creative thinker." Yet, according to Buddhadasa, Buddhaghosa was influenced by Hindu thought, and the uncritical respect for the Visuddhimagga has even hindered the practice of authentic Buddhism.

== Sources ==
- Bhikkhu Ñāṇamoli (1999), "Introduction", in Buddhaghosa (ed.), Visuddhimagga: The Path of Purification, translated by Bhikkhu Ñāṇamoli, Seattle: Buddhist Publication Society, ISBN 1-928706-01-0
- Bullitt, John T. (2002), Beyond the Tipitaka: A Field Guide to Post-canonical Pali Literature, archived from the original on 2009-05-09
- Buswell, Robert, ed. (2004), Encyclopedia of Buddhism, MacMillan
- Crosby, Kate (2004), "Theravada", in Buswell, Robert E. Jr. (ed.), Macmillan Encyclopedia of Buddhism, USA: Macmillan Reference USA, pp. 836–841, ISBN 0-02-865910-4
- Ganeri, Jonardon (2018), Attention, Not Self, Oxford University Press
- Gombrich, Richard F. (12 November 2012). Buddhist Precept & Practice. London: Routledge. ISBN 978-1-136-15623-6.
- Gray, James, trans. (1892), Buddhaghosuppatti or the Historical Romance of the Rise and Career of Buddhaghosa, London: Luzac
- Heim, Maria (2013), The Forerunner of All Things: Buddhaghosa on Mind, Intention, and Agency, USA: OUP USA
- Heim, Maria (2018), Voice of the Buddha: Buddhaghosa on the Immeasurable Words, Oxford University Press
- Hinüber, Oskar von (1996), A Handbook of Pali Literature, New Delhi: Munshiram Manoharal Publishers Pvt. Ltd., ISBN 81-215-0778-2
- Kalupahana, David J. (1994), A history of Buddhist philosophy, Delhi: Motilal Banarsidass Publishers Private Limited
- McMahan, David L. (2008), The Making of Buddhist Modernism, Oxford University Press, ISBN 9780195183276
- Pranke, Patrick A. (2004), "Myanmar", in Buswell, Robert E. Jr. (ed.), Macmillan Encyclopedia of Buddhism, USA: Macmillan Reference USA, pp. 574–577, ISBN 0-02-865910-4
- Rogers, Henry Thomas, trans. (1870): Buddhaghosha's Parables / translated from Burmese. With an Introduction, containing Buddha's Dhammapada, or "Path of Virtue" / transl. from Pâli by F. Max Müller, London: Trübner.
- Shankman, Richard (2008), The Experience of Samadhi: An In-depth Exploration of Buddhist Meditation, Shambhala
- Shaw, Sarah (2006), Buddhist Meditation: An Anthology of Texts from the Pali Canon, Routledge
- Sponberg, Alan (2004), "Maitreya", in Buswell, Robert E. Jr. (ed.), Macmillan Encyclopedia of Buddhism, USA: Macmillan Reference USA, ISBN 0-02-865910-4
- Strong, John (2004), "Buddhaghosa", in Buswell, Robert E. Jr. (ed.), Macmillan Encyclopedia of Buddhism, USA: Macmillan Reference USA, p. 75, ISBN 0-02-865910-4
