= Pāṭimokkha =

Monastic code of Theravadin Buddhists

Theravada Bhikkhu Pāṭimokkha
Buddhist monks Pāṭimokkha pali chanting in the Buddhist temple on Uposatha Day, recorded from Wat Khung Taphao, Uttaradit Province, Thailand.

In Theravada Buddhism, the Pāṭimokkha is the basic code of monastic discipline, consisting of 227 rules for fully ordained monks (bhikkhus) and 311 for nuns (bhikkhuṇīs). It is contained in the Suttavibhaṅga, a division of the Vinaya Piṭaka.

== Pārājika ==
The four pārājikas (lit. "defeats") are rules entailing expulsion from the sangha for life. If a monk breaks any one of the rules he is automatically "defeated" in the holy life and falls from monkhood immediately. He is not allowed to become a monk again in his lifetime. Intention is necessary in all these four cases to constitute an offence. The four parajikas for bhikkus are:

1. Sexual intercourse: engaging in any sexual intercourse.
2. Stealing: the robbery of anything worth more than 1/24 troy ounce of gold (as determined by local law).
3. Killing: bringing about the death of a human being—whether by killing the person, arranging for an assassin to kill the person, inciting the person to die, or describing the advantages of death.
4. Lying: lying to another person that one has attained a superior human state, such as claiming to be an arahant when one knows one is not, or claiming to have attained one of the jhānas when one knows one has not.

The pārājikas are more specific definitions of the first four of the Five Precepts.

== Saṅghādisesa ==
The thirteen saṅghādisesas are rules requiring an initial and subsequent meeting of the sangha (communal meetings). If a monk breaks any rule here he has to undergo a period of probation or discipline after which, if he shows himself to be repentant, he may be reinstated by a sangha of not less than twenty monks. Like the pārājikas, the saṅghādisesas can only come about through the monk's own intention and cannot be accidentally invoked. The thirteen saṅghādisesas for bhikkus are:

1. Discharge of semen or getting someone to discharge your semen, except while dreaming.
2. Lustful bodily contact with a woman, including kissing or holding hands.
3. Making lustful remarks to a woman alluding to her genitals or sexual intercourse.
4. Requesting sexual favors from a woman, or telling her that she would benefit spiritually from having sex with the monk.
5. Arranging for a date, affair, or marriage between a man and woman.
6. Building a hut without permission from the sangha, or building a hut that exceed 3 x 1.75 meters in size.
7. Having someone else build a hut for you without permission from the sangha, or exceeding 3 x 1.75 meters in size.
8. Making unfounded charges about another bhikkhu in the hopes of having him disrobed.
9. Making deceitfully worded charges about another bhikkhu in the hopes of having him disrobed.
10. Agitating for a schism, even after having been rebuked three times.
11. Supporting an agitator, even after he was rebuked three times (only applies if there are fewer than four supporters.)
12. Rejecting well-grounded criticism, even after having been rebuked three times.
13. Criticizing the justice of one's own banishment, even after having been rebuked three times.

== Aniyata ==
The aniyata are two indefinite rules where a monk is accused of having committed an offence with a woman in a screened (enclosed) or private place by a lay person. It is indefinite because the final outcome depends on whether the monk acknowledges the offence. Benefit of the doubt is given to the monk unless there is over-riding evidence.

Thus it is not proper for a monk to be alone with a woman, especially in screened or private places.

1. Sitting in private with a woman on a seat secluded enough for sexual intercourse and the monk acknowledges the offense
2. Sitting in private with a woman on a seat not sufficiently secluded for sexual intercourse but sufficiently so to address lewd words and the monk acknowledges the offense

== Nissaggiya pācittiya ==
The nissaggiya pācittiya are rules entailing "confession with forfeiture." They are mostly concerned with the possessing of items which are disallowed or obtained in disallowable ways. The monk must forfeit the item and then confess his offense to another monk. There are thirty nissaggiya pācittiya for bhikkhu.

== Pācittiya ==
Pacittiya are rules entailing confession. There are ninety-two pacittiya; these are minor violations which do not entail expulsion or any probationary periods.

== Patidesanīya ==
Patidesaniya are violations which must be verbally acknowledged.

1. Accepting and eating food from an unrelated bhikkuṇī.
2. Accepting and eating food after a bhikkuṇī has instructed the donors on whom to give what food, and none of the bhikkus rebuke the bhikkuṇī.
3. Accepting and eating food from a family that the sangha designates as "in training", that is, preparing to becoming arahants, unless if the monk is sick.
4. Accepting and eating food from a family living in a dangerous location, unless if the monk is sick.

== Sekhiyavatta ==
There are seventy-five sekhiya or rules of training, which are mainly about the deportment of a monk. These rules consist of Sāruppa (proper behavior; 26), Bhojanapatisamyutta (food; 30), Dhammadesanāpatisamyutta (teaching dhamma; 16) and Pakinnaka (miscellaneous; 3). In many countries, it is also standard for novice monks (samanera) to follow the Sekhiyavatta rules in addition to the Ten Precepts.

== Adhikarana-samatha ==
Adhikarana-samatha are seven rules for settlement of legal processes that concern monks only.

1. When an issue is settled, the verdict should be in the presence of the sangha, the parties, the Dhamma and the Vinaya.
2. If the bhikku is innocent, the verdict should be "mindfulness".
3. If the bhikku was or is insane, the verdict should be "past insanity".
4. If the bhikku confesses to the exact allegations, the verdict should be "acting in accordance with what was admitted".
5. If the dispute cannot be unanimously settled, the sangha should take a vote and the verdict should be "acting in accordance with the majority".
6. If the bhikku confesses only after interrogation, the verdict should be "acting in accordance with the accused's further misconduct".
7. If both sides agree that they are not acting the way monks ought to, they can call a full assembly of the sima and confess their mistakes, and the verdict should be "covering over as with grass."

== Notes ==
_{1. From Buddhist Monastic Code 1, Chapter 4: Parajika. Copyright © 1994, 2007 Thanissaro Bhikkhu Access to Insight edition © 2007}

== See also ==
- Buddhist ethics
- Early Buddhist Schools
- Ordination process for Sangha
- Pabbajjā
- Pratimoksha
- Schools of Buddhism
- Vinaya Pitaka
- Vinaya
