= Eight Garudhammas =

Controversial Buddhist nun gender hierarchy rules

The controversial Eight Garudhammas (Sanskrit: guru-dharma, (Note: Here garu or guru is used as an adjective, the wikilink points to the associated sanskrit noun. See The Pali Text Society's Pali-English dictionary entry for "garu".) translated as 'rules of respect', 'principles of respect', 'principles to be respected') were considered additional precepts required of bhikkhunis (fully ordained Buddhist nuns) above and beyond the monastic rule (vinaya) that applied to monks. They are controversial because they attempt to prescribe an inferior role for nuns, and bhikkhunis have revealed scholarly evidence that the Eight Garudhammas are not found in the historical teachings of Gautama Buddha.

Garu literally means 'heavy' and when applied to vinaya, it means "heavy offense that entails penance (mānatta) consisting of 2 weeks" as described in garudhamma rule No. 5. The authenticity of these rules is contested; they were supposedly added to the (bhikkhunis) vinaya "to allow more acceptance" of a monastic order for women, during the Buddha's time

== Narrative of the first bhikkhuni ordination ==
The first nun was Mahapajapati Gotami (Sanskrit Mahaprajapati Gautami), the aunt and adoptive mother of the Buddha. Five years after his enlightenment, she was the spokesperson of a group of women who requested he ordain women as monastics. Bhikṣuṇī Karma Lekshe Tsomo writes,

Although modern scholarship questions their validity, traditional renditions of this incident recount that the Buddha hesitated three times before admitting these women to the order, saying "Be cautious, Gautamī, of the going forth of women from home into homelessness in the Dharma and the discipline proclaimed by the Tathāgata." When the Buddha's attendant (and cousin) Ānanda questioned him concerning the spiritual capacities of women, the Buddha is said to have replied that women were as capable as men of achieving liberation, a fact verified by the multitude of women who achieved the state of an arhat during his lifetime. Having thus affirmed women's equal capacity for spiritual enlightenment, the Buddha is said to have relented and agreed to establish the female counterpart of the Bhikṣu Sangha.

== Authenticity and researches ==
Bhikkhu Analayo has stated that the historicity of the gurudharmas is "a rather doubtful matter" but notes that they are present in all Vinayas. He says

When evaluated from the viewpoint of their narrative context, it seems clear that the formulations of the gurudharma concerning bhikṣuṇī ordination found in the Mūlasarvāstivāda, Sarvāstivāda, and Saṃmitīya Vinayas reflect an earlier version. This earlier version did not yet stipulate the necessity of training as a sikṣamāna and it prescribed ordination given by bhikṣus only, not by both communities.

Yin Shun has noted the inconsistency of the Garudhammas in various Buddhist scriptures. Thich Nhat Hanh believes them to have been intended as temporary rules. Ute Hüsken agrees that there is inconsistency saying

These eight rules serve not only as admission criteria but also as rules that are to be observed for life by every nun. It is therefore striking that this set of rules in the Pāli Vinaya is not part of the Bhikkhunīpāṭimokkha. However, seven of these rules do in fact have parallels either in word or in content with other rules stated in the Bhikkhunīpāṭimokkha. Moreover, it is remarkable that these eight rules, although depicted as a precondition for ordination, are not at all mentioned in the ordination formulas for nuns, as given elsewhere in the Cullavagga.

Bhikkhu Anālayo and Thanissaro Bhikkhu state that garudhammas were initially simply "set out as principles" and did not have the status of a formal training rule until violations occurred.

The English translation of the Eight Garudhammas is reproduced below:

(1) A nun who has been ordained even for a hundred years must greet respectfully, rise up from her seat, salute with joined palms, do proper homage to a monk ordained but that day.

Murcott writes about Mahapajapati's purported later request: "I would ask one thing of the Blessed One, Ananda. It would be good if the Blessed One would allow making salutations, standing up in the presence of another, paying reverence and the proper performance of duties, to take place equally between both bhikkhus and bhikkhunis according to seniority." Those who believe in the garudhammas also recount the story of this rule being altered after six monks lifted up their robes to show their thighs to the nuns. They believe that the Buddha learned about this, and made an exception to that rule so that nuns need not pay respect to such monks. According to the altered rule, a bhikkhuni does not have to bow to every monk, only to a monk who is worthy of respect.

(2) A nun must not spend the rains (vassa, 3 months rainy season retreat) in a residence where there are no monks.

(3) Every half-month a nun should desire two things from the Order of Monks: the asking as to the date of the Observance (uposatha) day, and the coming for the exhortation [bhikkhunovada].

(4) After the rains a nun must 'invite' [pavarana] before both orders in respect of three matters, namely what was seen, what was heard, what was suspected.

However, even proponents of the garudhammas concede that amendments were made to these rules. The revised version allows bhikkhunis to perform pavarana by themselves.

(5) A nun, offending against an important rule, must undergo manatta discipline for half a month before both orders. Thanissaro Bhikkhu's translation varies: "(5) A bhikkhuni who has broken any of the vows of respect must undergo penance for half a month under both Sanghas."

(6) When, as a probationer, she has trained in the six rules [cha dhamma] for two years, she should seek higher ordination from both orders.

The sixth gurudharma mentions śikṣamāṇās, who train for two years in preparation to become bhikkhunis. It says that after a probationer has trained with a bhikkhuni for two years, that bhikkhuni preceptor has the responsibility to fully ordain her. However, when the Buddha ordained Mahapajapati, probationer ordination did not exist. He ordained her directly as a bhikkhuni. This is one of the many textual errors in the garudhammas: the Buddha supposedly created one rule that requires probationer training which did not exist in the Buddha's time.

(7) A monk must not be abused or reviled in any way by a nun.

(8) From today, admonition of monks by nuns is forbidden. [Book of the Discipline, V.354–355]

Scholars such as Akira Hirakawa, Hae-ju Chun (a bhikṣunī and assistant professor at Tongguk University in Seoul, Korea) and in Young-chun argue that these eight rules were added later. In notes:

- there is a discrepancy between the Pali bhikkhuni Vinaya
- the fact that these same rules are treated only as a minor offence (requiring only confession as expiation) in the pāyantika dharmas.

Gurmeet Kaur asserts that "The first, seventh, and eighth garudhamma ensure that Bhikkuṇī do not under any condition assert their superiority over the Bhikkhus. To justify this attitude of Buddha, the Theravada tradition attempts to argue that the organization of the monastic order vis-à-vis the social order of the time combined with moral and ethical values, loomed large in the mind of the Buddha."

Leigh Brasington has argued that based on textural evidence, Ananda would have been a teenager and therefore according to him: "It seems very implausible to me that a teenager – someone about the same age as the Buddha's son Rahula – would have enough influence over the Buddha to get him to change his mind about something he had rejected three times on multiple occasions."

Hae-ju Chun, a Bhikṣunī and assistant professor at Tongguk University in Seoul, Korea, argues that six of the Eight Rules (#1, 2, 4, 6, 7, 8) belong to the Bhikṣunī Pāyantika Dharmas, as they are the same as or similar to rules found there. We may compare the differences in the punishment for any offence of the Eight Rules with that for an offence of the pāyantika dharmas. Violation of any of the Eight Rules means that women cannot be ordained. The Eight Rules must be observed throughout the Bhikṣunīs lives. However, the pāyantika dharmas (#175, 145, 124 or 126, 141, 143, 142) require only confession, as there offences of bhikkhunis are considered to be violations of minor rules. Based on the differences in the gravity of offences between the Eight Rules and the pāyantika dharmas, she also asserts the probability that the Eight Rules might have been added later.

Most of these rules are also found in the pāyantika dharmas as minor rules since they only require confession: "Theriya tradition, which at some stage, seems to have accommodated the idea that the Buddha conceded the abrogation of the minor rules [D.II.14 & VIn.II.287]". This agrees with the fact that rival groups such as Jainism also had the first rule for women according to the Śvētāmbara school. (The other surviving Jain school, the Digambara, denies both women's ordination and liberation.)

== Effects on the ordination of women ==
When giving the Eight Garudhammas to Mahapajapati Gotami, the Buddha supposedly said they would constitute her full ordination (Pali:upasampada): "If Mahapajapati Gotami accepts these eight vows of respect, that will be her full ordination." However, Bhikkunī Kusuma in her article "Inaccuracies in Buddhist Women's History" has pointed out a number of inaccuracies in the ways the Eight Garudhammas have been recorded in the Pali Canon and its commentaries. And others point out the plethora of textual problems with the position for garudhammas Tathaaloka Bhikkhuni published evidence that the Eight Garundhammas are non-historical.

In Theravada Buddhism today, the full Bhikkhuni ordination lineage has been restored in Sri Lanka (though not 'formally accepted'), but Theravadin nuns in other countries find it extremely difficult to obtain full ordination. Although some expressed an interest in receiving the full ordination via the surviving Mahayana full Bhikkhuni ordination in the course of the 20th century, it was not simply the difficulties of ordination from a different school of Buddhism that deterred them. Ellison Banks Findly reports that mae jis in Thailand were also deterred by the prospect of full ordination requiring them keeping the Eight Garudhammas and therefore having a formal subordination to the monks in addition to existing cultural discrimination.

In 2003 the first Thai woman to receive full Bhikkhuni ordination under the dharma name of Dhammananda was Dr. Chatumarn Kabilsingh, a former university professor. Dhammananda Bhikkhuni now heads a temple for Buddhist women, enjoying extremely narrow recognition in Thai society.

Although Tibetan Buddhism has not had a bhikshuni ordination lineage, until Ven. Tenzin Palmo, ordained since 1973, it had only a tradition of novice nuns, it has had a number of women practitioners who were yoginis. Many Buddhist scholars and laypeople all over the world want to help Tibetans to establish a full ordination. Bhikshuni Prof. Dr. Karma Lekshe Tsomo, University of San Diego, California, US, President of Sakyadhita International Association of Buddhist Women stated, while talking about Gender Equality and Human Rights: "It would be helpful if Tibetan nuns could study the bhikshuni vows before the ordination is established. The traditional custom is that one is only allowed to study the bhikshu or bhikshuni vows after having taken them. Moreover, at present, the Tibetan nuns are prevented from completing the Geshema degree, since Vinaya is one of the five subjects studied and they are not permitted to study it without already being bhikshunis."

== See also ==
- Bhikkhuni
- Women in Buddhism
- International Congress on Buddhist Women's Role in the Sangha

== Sources ==
- Hirakawa, Akira (1999). Monastic Discipline for the Buddhist Nuns: An English Translation of the Chinese Text of the Mahāsāṃghika-Bhikṣuṇī-Vinaya. Kashi Prasad Jayaswal Research Institute.
- Tsomo, Karma Lekshe (2013). Innovative Buddhist Women: Swimming Against the Stream. Routledge. ISBN 978-1-136-11426-7.
