= Jamyang =

Jamyang is a given name. Notable people with the given name include:

- Jamyang Dolma (born 1984), Chinese singer of Tibetan ethnicity
- Jamyang Donyo Gyaltsen (1310–1344), ruler of the Sakya school of Tibetan Buddhism
- Jamyang Rinchen Gyaltsen (1257–1305), ruler of the Sakya school of Tibetan Buddhism
- Jamyang Shakya Gyaltsen (1340–1373), ruler of Central Tibet in 1364–1373
- Mipham Jamyang Namgyal Gyamtso (1846–1912), philosopher and polymath of the Nyingma school of Tibetan Buddhism
- Dzongsar Jamyang Khyentse (born 1961), Tibetan/Bhutanese lama, filmmaker, and writer
- Jamyang Kyi (born 1965), Tibetan singer, feminist and writer, journalist, television broadcaster
- Jamyang Khyentse Chokyi Lodro (1893–1959), Tibetan lama, a master of many lineages, teacher
- Jamyang Namgial (born 1985), Indian skier
- Jamyang Namgyal (died 1616), Namgyal dynasty king of Ladakh, India from 1595 to 1616
- Jamyang Tsering Namgyal (born 1985), Indian politician and MP from Ladakh, India
- Jamyang Norbu (born 1949), Tibetan political activist and writer, currently living in US
- Jamyang Jamtsho Wangchuk (born 1982), Bhutanese actor and film producer
- Jamyang Khyentse Wangpo (1820–1892), teacher, scholar and tertön of 19th-century Tibet

== See also ==
- Jamyang Foundation, registered 501(c)3 non-profit organization based in San Diego that provides educational programs to Buddhist women and girls
- Jamyang Zhepas, a lineage of tulkus of the Gelug school of Tibetan Buddhism
