= International Congress on Buddhist Women's Role in the Sangha =

2007 event in Germany

The International Congress on Buddhist Women's Role in the Sangha: Bhikshuni Vinaya and Ordination Lineages was an historic event that took place July 18–20, 2007. It was a meeting of internationally recognized Buddhist scholars specializing in monastic discipline and history, as well as practitioners. It was expected to be the final discussion of a decades-long dialogue about re-establishing full bhikshuni ordination in Buddhist traditions. Papers and research based on Buddhist texts and contemporary practice traditions in China, Korea, Taiwan, Tibet, and South Asia were presented, between them the Abstract: The Eight Garudhammas. The fourteenth Dalai Lama attended the final day of the conference and conclusions. His letter of support is available to the public (see references below).

Discussions, amongst both scholars and practitioners, at the first Congress were planned primarily about the Tibetan Buddhist tradition. Other Bhikkshuni lineages which could be restored were also expected to be on the agenda. The Congress was held at University of Hamburg, Germany, July 18–20, 2007, hosted by the University of Hamburg's Asia-Africa Institute.

After statements from the many bhikkus and bhikkshunis present, the Dalai Lama announced that, while he supported the case, he needed to discuss the matter with senior lamas representing the different schools of Tibetan Buddhism to gain a consensus view. He added that from 2008 (or if possible 2007) nuns were to practice three monastic ceremonies, posadha, vassa and pavarana, as preparation for the establishment of a Bhikkhuni Sangha in the near future. These, he declared, should be held in Tibetan and follow the dharmaguptaka vinaya. A full statement was issued by the Dalai Lama detailing this.

Bhikshuni and Yogini Tenzin Palmo—a member of the Committee of Western Bhikshunis—belonging to Drukpa Lineage of the Kagyu school in her statement A brief overview of the situation for nuns in the Tibetan Tradition elaborated that in spite of full Bhikshuni ordination monks had not to be afraid because according to vinaya they were going to keep their higher position.

The six-member 'Committee of Western Bhikshunis' is an organisation of senior Western nuns supported by two Advisors from Taiwan (Ven. Bhiksuni Heng-ching Shih, Professor of Philosophy at Taiwan National University (Gelongma ordination 1975 in San Francisco) and Ven. Bhikshuni Wu-yin, Vinaya Master). It was formed in the autumn of 2005, after the Dalai Lama told Bhikshuni Jampa Tsedroen that the Western bhikshunis should be more involved in helping to establish the bhikshuni ordination in the Tibetan tradition.

To help establish the Bhikshuni Sangha (community of fully ordained nuns) where it does not currently exist had already been declared in 1987 one of the objectives of Sakyadhita, as expressed at its founding meeting in 1987 in Bodhgaya, India.

== The eight Garudhammas/Gurudharmas of the Bhikshuni Vinaya ==
The basic difference between Bhikshuni Vinaya and Bhikshu Vinaya (= discipline) are the eight rules of respect, known as The Eight Garudhammas. According to scripture and legend they have come from Buddha Shakyamuni himself.

Buddha: Ananda, if Mahapajapati Gotami accepts eight vows of respect, that will be her full ordination (upasampada).

"(1) A bhikkhuni who has been fully ordained even for more than a century must bow down, rise up from her seat, salute with hands palm-to-palm over her heart, and perform the duties of respect to a bhikkhu even if he has been fully ordained only a day. This rule is to be honored, respected, revered, venerated, never to be transgressed as long as she lives."

"(2)A bhikkhuni must not spend the rains in a residence where there is no bhikkhu...

"(3) Every half-month a bhikkhuni should request two things from the Bhikkhu Sangha: she should ask for the date of the uposatha day and come for an exhortation...

"(4) At the end of the Rains-residence, a bhikkhuni should invite (criticism both from) the Bhikkhu Sangha and the Bhikkhuni Sangha on any of three grounds: what they have seen, what they have heard, what they have suspected...

"(5) A bhikkhuni who has broken any of the vows of respect must undergo penance for half a month under both Sanghas...

"(6) Only after a probationer has trained in the six precepts for two years should she request ordination from both Sanghas...

"(7) A bhikkhu must not in any way be insulted or reviled by a bhikkhuni...

"(8) From this day forward, the admonition of a bhikkhu by a bhikkhuni is forbidden, but the admonition of a bhikkhuni by a bhikkhu is not forbidden. This rule, too, is to be honored, respected, revered, venerated, never to be transgressed as long as she lives.

Buddha: "If Mahapajapati Gotami accepts these eight vows of respect, that will be her full ordination."

== Procedure of Women Ordination ==
Alexander Berzin states: "The ordination procedure involves asking the candidates a list of questions concerning impediments (bar-chad-kyi chos, Skt. antarayikadharma, Pali: antarayikadhamma) she may have that might hinder her from keeping the full set of vows. In addition to the questions asked in common with candidates for bhikshu ordination, these include further questions concerning her anatomy as a female."

== Important quotations on equality of buddhist nuns ==
Equality of Full Ordination

In societies that value gender equality and human rights, people will see Buddhism as irrelevant to modern society if men can be fully ordained but women cannot. For example, some people turn away from Buddhism saying, "The Buddha taught equality and equanimity for all beings, yet Buddhist institutions do not provide equal opportunities for women to ordain and practice."

taken from the interview with Bhikshuni Thubten Chodron, Committee of Western Bhikshunis

Discriminating against buddhist nuns within Full Ordination

To raise the status of Tibetan nuns, it is important not only to re-establish the Mulasarvastivada bhikshuni ordination, but also for the new bhikshunis to ignore the eight gurudharmas that have regulated their lower status. These eight, after all, were formulated for the sole purpose of avoiding censure by the lay society. In the modern world, disallowing the re-establishment of the Mulasarvastivada bhikshuni ordination and honoring these eight risk that very censure.

taken from Berzin Summary Report

Equality generally speaking

Sometimes in religion there has been an emphasis on male importance. In Buddhism, however, the highest vows, namely the bhikshu and bhikshuni ones, are equal and entail the same rights. This is the case despite the fact that in some ritual areas, due to social custom, bhikshus go first. But Buddha gave the basic rights equally to both sangha groups. There is no point in discussing whether or not to revive the bhikshuni ordination; the question is merely how to do so properly within the context of the Vinaya.

taken from Berzin Summary Report

Impacts of bowing

But leaving aside the cultural aspects, the act of bowing invokes a deeper resonance, harking back to the ritual submission of one animal to another in a fight. Bowing, like trees bending in the wind, shows that one will bend to the will of the other. And while the Vinaya as a rational legal text does not grant the monks any power of command over the bhikkhunis whatsoever, the emotional surrender signified by the bow conveys an unmistakable submission. Here the earlier mentioned dichotomy between the individual and institutional becomes fully apparent: on a personal level, the act of bowing is a graceful training in humility, but on an institutional level it serves the interests of power.

A Painful Ambiguity - Attitudes towards nuns in Buddhist myth by Bhikkhu Sujato 25/9/2007

Giving joy to monks in order to foster openmindedness

Yes, but in Plum Village, we do not observe them because Thay says that these Eight Observations were invented to help the stepmother of the Buddha only. He says you need to keep the 14 precepts properly. That's all. But of course he doesn't despise the traditional precepts. And I can accept them just to give joy to the monks who practice in the traditional way. If I can give them joy, I will have a chance to share my insights about women with them, and then they will be unblocked in their understanding.

Sister Chan Khong

== See also ==
- Bhikkhuni
- Ordination of women in Buddhism
- Sangha
- Women in Buddhism
  - First buddhist council
  - Second buddhist council

== Bibliography ==
- Thea Mohr; Jampa Tsedroen (2014). Dignity and Discipline: Reviving Full Ordination for Buddhist Nuns. Wisdom Publications. ISBN 978-0-86171-830-6.
