= Dolma (disambiguation) =

Dolma is a family of stuffed vegetable dishes.

Dolma may also refer to:

== People ==
- Alan Dawa Dolma (born 1987), Chinese pop singer of Tibetan ethnicity, active in China and Japan
- Ani Choying Dolma (born 1971), Nepalese Buddhist nun
- Dicky Dolma (born 1974), Indian mountaineer
- Dolma Gyari (born 1964), Tibetan politician in exile
- Dolma Kyab (born 1976), Tibetan writer and teacher
- Dolma Yangchen, president of the Tibetan Women's Association
- Jamyang Dolma (born 1984), Chinese pop singer of Tibetan ethnicity
- Lhaki Dolma (fl. 2018–present), Bhutanese actress and politician
- Lobsang Dolma Khangkar (1934–1989), practitioner of traditional Tibetan medicine
- Shelok Dolma (born 1987), Chinese wrestler of Tibetan ethnicity
- Sonam Dolma Brauen (born 1953), Tibetan-Swiss painter
- Tsering Dolma (1919–1964), older sister of the 14th Dalai Lama
- Tseten Dolma (born 1937), Chinese soprano of Tibetan ethnicity

== Other uses ==
- Dolma (film), a 2012 Tibetan film
