= Karma Lekshe Tsomo =

Venerable Karma Lekshe Tsomo
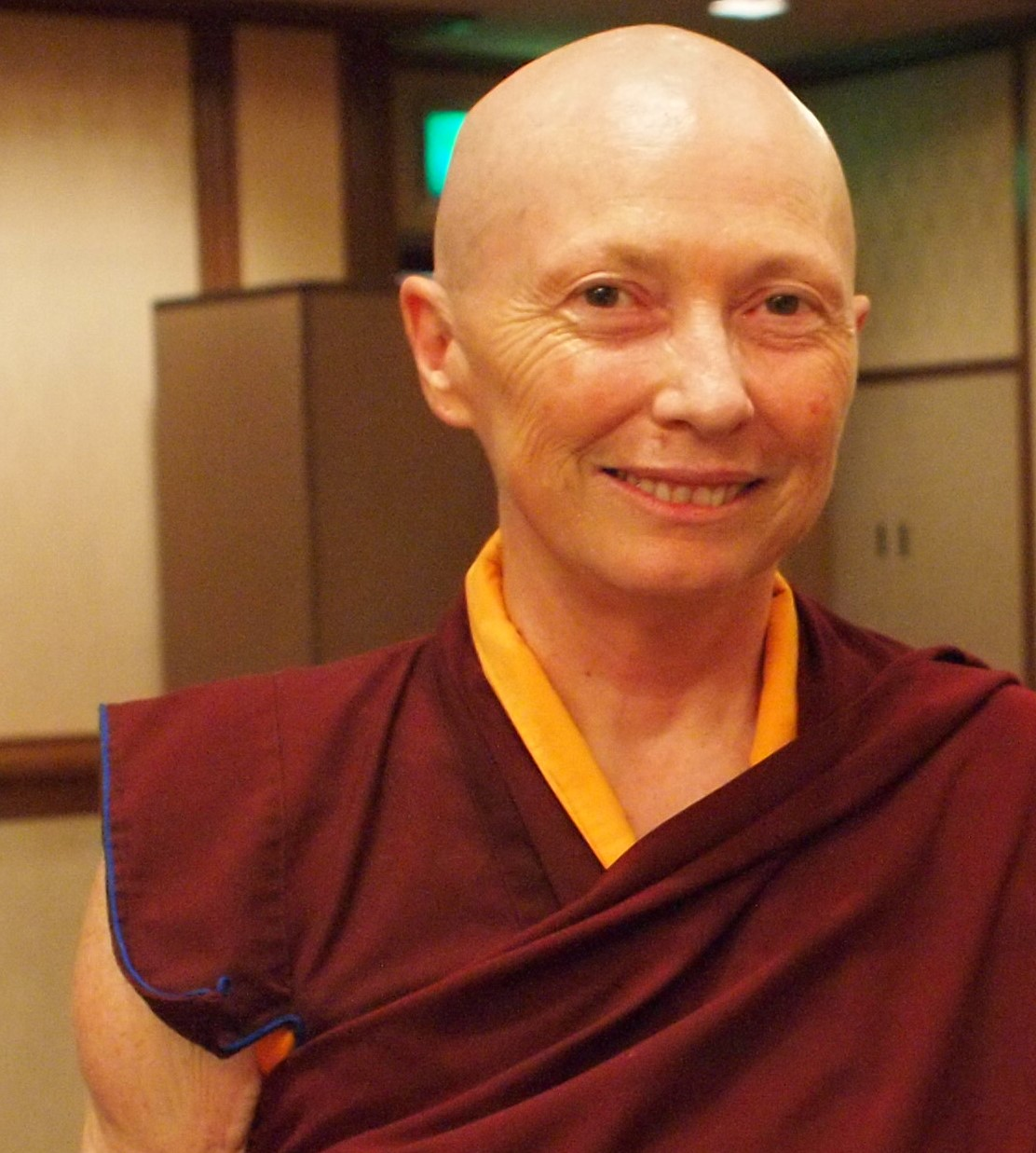
- Born: Patricia Zenn; 23 September 1944 (age 81)
- Occupations: Scholar and social activist
- Organization(s): Sakyadhita, Jamyang Foundation

Karma Lekshe Tsomo (born 23 September 1944) is a Buddhist nun, scholar and social activist. She is a professor at the University of San Diego, where she teaches Buddhism, World Religions, and Dying, Death, and Social Justice. She is co-founder of the Sakyadhita International Association of Buddhist Women and the founding director of the Jamyang Foundation, which supports the education of women and girls in the Himalayan region, the Chittagong Hill Tracts of Bangladesh, and elsewhere. She took novice precepts as a Buddhist nun in France in 1977 and full ordination in Korea in 1982.

== Early life ==
Karma Lekshe Tsomo's was born in Delaware in 1944 under her given name, Patricia Zenn. She was raised in Malibu California. Her birth surname, Zenn comes from a misspelling on a relative's passport of the German last name Zinn. This error led to a childhood interest in Zen Buddhism and her career as a Buddhist scholar and nun. In 1977, Patricia Zenn became a novice nun in France, ordained in the Tibetan Buddhist tradition by the Sixteenth Gyalua Karmapa. At this time, she was given the name Karma Lekshe Tsomo. Later that year, she moved to Dharamshula, India and took classes under the Dalai Lama. In 1982, she took full ordination in Korea.

== Scholarly career ==
Karma Lekshe Tsomo was a professor of Buddhist Studies at the University of San Diego, where she taught from 2000 to 2022, and the Numata Professor of Buddhist Studies at the University of Hawai'i at Manoa in 2023. After fifteen years studying Buddhism in Dharamsala, she did her postgraduate work at the University of Hawai'i at Manoa, earning a PhD in Comparative Philosophy in 2000. Her research has primarily concerned women in Buddhism, death and dying, and Buddhist philosophy and ethics.

== Social activism ==
In 1985 Karma Lekshe Tsomo founded the Jamyang Foundation, a non-profit organization that works to improve educational opportunities for women and girls, and currently supports thirteen monastic study programmes in the Himalayan region of India and in Bangladesh. At a gathering at Bodhgaya in 1987 she became one of the founding members of Sakydhita (Daughters of the Buddha), which campaigns for gender equality in Buddhism. She is the director of La'i Peace Center in Waialua, Hawai'i, a resource for peace education, Buddhist studies, and community service under the auspices of Sakyadhita Hawai'i.

== Major publications ==
- Women in Buddhist Traditions (2020). New York: New York University Press. ISBN 978-1-4798-0342-2.
- Buddhist Femininisms and Femininities (editor) (2019). Albany, New York: State University of New York Press. ISBN 978-1-4384-7255-3.
- Eminent Buddhist Women (editor). (2014). Albany, New York: State University of New York Press. ISBN 978-1-4384-5131-2.
- Into the Jaws of Yama, Lord of Death: Buddhism, Bioethics, and Death (2006). Albany, New York: State University of New York Press. ISBN 978-0-7914-8145-5.
- Out of the Shadows: Socially Engaged Buddhist Women in the Global Community (editor) (2006). Delhi: Sri Satguru Publications. ISBN 978-8170308492.
- Buddhist Women and Social Justice: Ideals, Challenges, and Achievements (editor) (2004). Albany New York: State University of New York Press. ISBN 978-0-7914-6254-6.
- Innovative Buddhist Women: Swimming Against the Stream (editor) (2000). Richmond, Surrey: Routledge. ISBN 978-1-136-11418-2.
- Buddhist Women Across Cultures: Realizations (editor) (1999). Albany, New York: State University of New York Press. ISBN 978-0-7914-4138-1.
- Sisters in Solitude: Two Traditions of Buddhist Monastic Ethics for Women. A Comparative Analysis of the Chinese Dharmagupta and the Tibetan Mulasarvastivada Bhiksuni Pratimoksa Sutras (1996). Albany, New York: State University of New York Press. ISBN 978-1-4384-2238-1
- Buddhism Through American Women's Eyes (editor) (1995). Ithaca, New York: Snow Lion Publications. ISBN 978-1559390477.
- Sakyadhita: Daughters of the Buddha (editor) (1988). Ithaca, New York: Snow Lion Publications. ISBN 978-0937938720.
