= Śikṣamāṇā =

In Buddhism, a śikṣamāṇā (Sanskrit; Pali: sikkhamānā; traditional Chinese: 式叉摩那; ; pinyin: shìchāmónà; Thai: สิกขมานา; RTGS: Sikkhamana) is a female novice trainee. This training period is to be two years long, supervised by both a monk and a nun. After this period, the trainee may attempt full ordination as a bhikṣuṇī.

== Overview ==
According to Buddhist tradition, a young woman should be ordained, by both a monk and a nun, first as a śrāmaṇerī. Then, after a year, or at the age of 20, she may be ordained as a full bhikṣuṇī.

The Theravada vinaya has 311 rules of discipline for bhikkhunis. Within Chinese society, as an example, members of the Sangha are expected to renounce family connections and accept the Sangha as their family.

Thus, according to Vinaya Pitaka, the ordination order for women is:

1. Śrāmaṇerī
2. Śikṣamāṇā
3. Bhikṣuṇī

== See also ==
- Anagarika (pre-ordaination)
- Ordination process
