= Sakyadhita International Association of Buddhist Women =

Sakyadhītā International Association of Buddhist Women is a 501(c)3 nonprofit organization founded in 1987 at the conclusion of its first conference and registered in California in the United States in 1988. Sakyadhītā holds an international conference every two years, bringing together laypeople, nuns, and monks from different countries and traditions around the world.

== History ==
The organization was founded in 1987 in Bodhgaya, India. Sakyadhītā is an alliance of women and men founded at the conclusion of the first International Conference on Buddhist Women, held in Bodh Gaya, where the 14th Dalai Lama was the keynote speaker. The term Sakyadhītā means "daughters of the Buddha" and was first used at the conference. The initiative for creating the organization came from Ayya Khema, Karma Lekshe Tsomo, Dr. Chatsumarn Kabilsingh (now Dhammananda Bhikkhuni) and Carola Roloff (now Bhikṣuni Jampa Tsedroen). Currently, Sakyadhītā has almost 2000 members in 45 countries around the world. National branches of Sakyadhītā have been established in Australia, Canada, France, Germany, Korea, Nepal, Portugal, Spain, Taiwan, the United Kingdom, and the United States. New branches are currently being formed in Indonesia, Malaysia, Mongolia, Russia, and Vietnam.

== Conferences ==
An international conference is held every two years. The conference brings together laypersons and nuns from different countries and traditions, to share their experiences, research, and to encourage projects to improve conditions for Buddhist women—especially in developing countries. Since 1987, Sakyadhītā has held 13 international conferences on Buddhist women in Asia and three in North America. The conferences feature papers, workshops, and performances on topics relevant to Buddhist women. The global gatherings are open to all, regardless of gender, ethnicity, or religion. The 14th Sakyadhītā conference was held in 2015 in Yogjakarta, Indonesia. The 15th Sakyadhītā conference was held in 2017 in Hong Kong. The 16th conference was held in Australia, and the 17th conference will be held online.

=== International ===
- 1987 Bodhgaya, India, "Buddhist Nuns in Society", Keynote by the 14th Dalai Lama
- 1991 Bangkok, Thailand, "Buddhist Women in the Modern World," Keynote by Chancellor of Thammasat University
- 1993 Colombo, Sri Lanka, "Buddhist Women in Modern Society," Keynote by Ranasinghe Premadasa, President of Sri Lanka
- 1995 Ladakh, India, "Women and the Power of Compassion: Survival in the 21st Century," Keynote by Rani Sarla, Queen of Ladakh
- 1997-1998 Phnom Penh, Cambodia, "Women in Buddhism: Unity and Diversity," Keynote by Queen Norodom Siranouk, Queen of Cambodia
- 2000 Lumbini, Nepal, "Women as Peacemakers: Self, Family, Community, World," Keynote by Minister of Culture and Sport
- 2002 Taipei, Taiwan, "Bridging Worlds," Keynote by Annette Shu-lien Lu, Vice President of the Republic of China
- 2004 Seoul, South Korea, "Discipline and Practice of Buddhist Women Past and Present," Keynotes by Kwangwoo Sunim, Anne Carolyn Klein, Paula Arai
- 2006 Kuala Lumpur, Malaysia, "Buddhist Women in a Global Multicultural Community," Keynote by Sharon Suh
- 2008 Ulaanbataar, Mongolia, "Buddhism in Transition: Tradition, Changes, and Challenges,″ Keynotes by Shundō Aoyama Rōshi and Myeong Seong Sunim
- 2009-2010 Ho Chi Minh City, Vietnam, "Eminent Buddhist Women," Keynote by C. Julia Huang
- 2011 Bangkok, Thailand, "Leading to Liberation," Keynote by Princess Srirasmi of Thailand
- 2013 Vaishali, India, "Buddhism at the Grassroots," Keynote by Thich Nu Khiet Minh
- 2015 Yogyakarta, Indonesia, "Compassion and Social Justice," Keynote by Karma Lekshe Tsomo
- 2017 Hong Kong, “Contemporary Buddhist Women: Contemplation, Cultural Exchange & Social Action,” Keynote by Rongdao Lai
- 2019 Australia, "New Horizons in Buddhism," Keynote by Susan Murphy, Roshi

=== United States ===
- 1988 Santa Barbara, California, "Buddhism Through American Women’s Eyes"
- 1996 Claremont, California, "Unity and Diversity"
- 2005 Northampton, Massachusetts, "Women Practicing Buddhism: American Experiences"

== Publications ==
Sakyadhita has published an annual newsletter since 1990. Papers presented at the Sakyadhita International Conferences on Buddhist Women have been published in a series of books edited by Karma Lekshe Tsomo: Sakyadhita: Daughters of the Buddha (1989), Buddhism Through American Women's Eyes (1994), Buddhist Women Across Cultures: Realizations (1999), Innovative Buddhist Women: Swimming Against the Stream (2000), Buddhist Women and Social Justice: Ideals, Challenges, and Achievements (2004), Bridging Worlds: Buddhist Women’s Voices Across Generations (2004), Out of the Shadows: Socially Engaged Buddhist Women (2006), Buddhist Women in a Global Multicultural Community (2008), Eminent Buddhist Women (2014), Compassion and Social Justice (2015), and Contemporary Buddhist Women: Contemplation, Cultural Exchange & Social Action. A number of these books have been translated into other languages, including Chinese, German, Indonesian, Korean, and Vietnamese.

== See also ==
- Therīgāthā
- Bhikkhuni
- Thilashin
- Maechi
- Siladhara Order
- Buddhist feminism
- Engaged Buddhism
- Women in Buddhism
- Sangha
