= Jamyang Foundation =

The Jamyang Foundation is a registered 501(c)3 non-profit organization based in San Diego that provides educational programs to Buddhist women and girls. Its mission chiefly centers around empowering underprivileged women and girls to create and manage self-sustaining communities.

Currently, the Foundation provides for thirteen study programs across the Indian Himalayan regions of Kinnaur, Spiti, and Zangskar. It has also founded three schools in the Chittagong Hill Tracts of Bangladesh. With quality education at a premium in these remote rural areas, the Foundation provides full scholarships to more than 500 students. The Foundation also supports outreach projects in Laos, Mongolia, Nepal, and Vietnam.

Besides funding study programs in the Himalayas and Bangladesh, Jamyang Foundation also supports Sanghamitra Institute in Bodhgaya (Bihar), site of the Buddha's awakening. Sanghamitra Institute is dedicated to improving life for women and children, especially those from economically, educationally, and socially disadvantaged backgrounds. After many struggles, Sanghamitra Institute opened its doors in January 2011. After more than 2,500 years, women finally have a place of their own in Bodhgaya! Currently, more than 75 Buddhist nuns from across the Himalayan regions of Kinnaur, Spiti, and Zanskar study at Sanghamitra Institute during the winter months.

In addition to supporting education, training, and healthcare, the Foundation offers volunteer teaching programs to those interested in helping educate underprivileged students. Subjects may include English, math, gardening, leadership skills, Hindi, social studies, accounting, healthcare, basic computer skills, environmental awareness, conflict resolution skills, and so on.

== Programs supported by the Jamyang Foundation ==
- Jampa Choling Institute (Meeru, Kinnaur)
- Yangchen Choling Monastery (Pangmo, Spiti)
- Dechen Choling Monastery (Pin Valley, Spiti)
- Changchub Choling Monastery (Zangla, Zanskar)
- Khachoe Drubling Monastery (Karsha, Zanksar)
- Namgyal Choling Monastery (Pichu, Zanksar)
- Phakmo Ling Monastery (Skyagam, Zanskar)
- Dorje Dzong Monastery (Dorge Dzong, Zanksar)
- Samten Chöling Monastery (Tungri, Zanksar)
- Pema Chöling Monastery (Manda, Zanksar)

Jamyang Foundation has founded four primary schools for Marma Girls in the Chittagong Hill Tracts of Bangladesh. The largest is Visakha Girls' School with 121 students, located near Manikchari in Khagrachari District. In line with the Foundation's goals, three education projects founded and developed by the organization are now completely self-sufficient.

- Visakha Girls' School (Manikchari, Khagrachari District, CHT)
