= Jamyang Dolma =

Chinese singer of Tibetan ethnicity (born 1984)

- འཇམ་དབྱངས་སྒྲོལ་མ
- Born: February 1, 1984 (age 42); Dêgê County, Garzê Tibetan Autonomous Prefecture, Sichuan, China
- Education: Sichuan Conservatory of Music; People's Liberation Army Academy of Art
- Occupation: Singer
- Years active: 2005-present
- Spouse: Dingzhen Quzha (m. 2014)
- Musical career
- Genres: Chinese Folk Music, Tibetan music

Chinese name
- Traditional Chinese: 降央卓瑪
- Simplified Chinese: 降央卓玛
Transcriptions
Standard Mandarin
- Hanyu Pinyin: Jiàngyāng Zhuómǎ

Tibetan name
- Tibetan: འཇམ་དབྱངས་སྒྲོལ་མ

Jamyang Dolma (Tibetan: འཇམ་དབྱངས་སྒྲོལ་མ, Wylie: 'jam dbyangs sgrol ma, THL: jam yang dröl ma; Chinese: 降央卓玛; pinyin: Jiàngyāng Zhuómǎ; born 1 February 1984) is a Chinese singer of Tibetan ethnicity.

== Early life and education ==
Jamyang Dolma was born in Dêgê County, Garzê Tibetan Autonomous Prefecture, Sichuan, on February 1, 1984, to a Tibetan peasant family. She dropped out of middle school due to poverty. She was discovered in a bar when she worked there as a waitress. Then she entered the Song and Dance Ensemble of Garzê Tibetan Autonomous Prefecture. She entered the Sichuan Conservatory of Music in 2003, majoring in singing at the Department of Vocality, where she graduated in 2005.

== Career ==
After graduation, Jamyang Dolma appeared in Fantasy Kalba.

In 2006, Jamyang Dolma attended the 3rd National Minorities Festival.

In March 2009, Jamyang Dolma sang the song "Colorful Hada" on the 50th Anniversary of the Liberation of Tibetan Serfs Variety Art Show on China Central Television (CCTV). The following June, she sang the song Mother's Miss on the 60th Anniversary of the Founding of the People's Republic of China Art Show. In December that same year, she released her album Female Country.

In February 2010, Jamyang Dolma participated in the 2010 Tibetan New Year's Gala and sang Auspicious Tibetan Calendar Year. In the following April, she released her album China Voices. In December that same year, she sang the song The Hulunbeir Grassland.

In March 2026, the Sichuan Provincial Department of Human Resources and Social Security granted her the professional title of "Second-Class Actor" (an associate senior-level title), following expert panel review and a favorable determination by the Sichuan Provincial Evaluation Committee for Associate Senior Professional Titles in the Arts Series for New Literary and Art Groups.

== Discography ==
=== Studio album ===
#	English title	Chinese title	Released	Label	Notes
1st	The Mountain, the Water	这山·这水	2008-06-12	China Record Corporation	
2nd	Golden Calling	金色的呼唤	2009-01-01	Guangdong Weiyang Culture Communication Co., Ltd.	
3rd	Golden Glory	金色的辉煌	2009	Guangdong Weiyang Culture Communication Co., Ltd.	
4th	Female Country	东女国	2009	Guangdong Xingwen Culture Communication Co., Ltd.	
5th	China Voices	中国之声	2010	Guangdong Weiyang Culture Communication Co., Ltd.	
6th	Golden Enticement	金色的诱惑	2011	Guangdong Weiyang Culture Communication Co., Ltd	
7th	World's Most Beautiful Mezzo-soprano	天下最美的女中音	2012	Guangdong Weiyang Culture Communication Co., Ltd.	

=== Singles ===
Year	English title	Chinese title	Notes
2008-06-12	The Lucky Ghee-lamp	吉祥的酥油灯	
2011-12-17	Common Conscience	平凡的良心	
2012-02-05	Drolma	卓玛	
2012-04-06	Warmth in Hands	手心里的温柔	
2014-02-19	Dating Again After Twenty Years	二十年后再相会	
2014-09-08	Homesickness	乡愁	
2014-11-22	The Hulunbeir Grassland	呼伦贝尔大草原	

== Personal life ==
On August 11, 2014, Jamyang Dolma was married to Dingzhen Quzha (Chinese: 丁珍曲扎), a photographer on China Central Television.
