= Carola Roloff =

German Buddhist nun (born 1959)

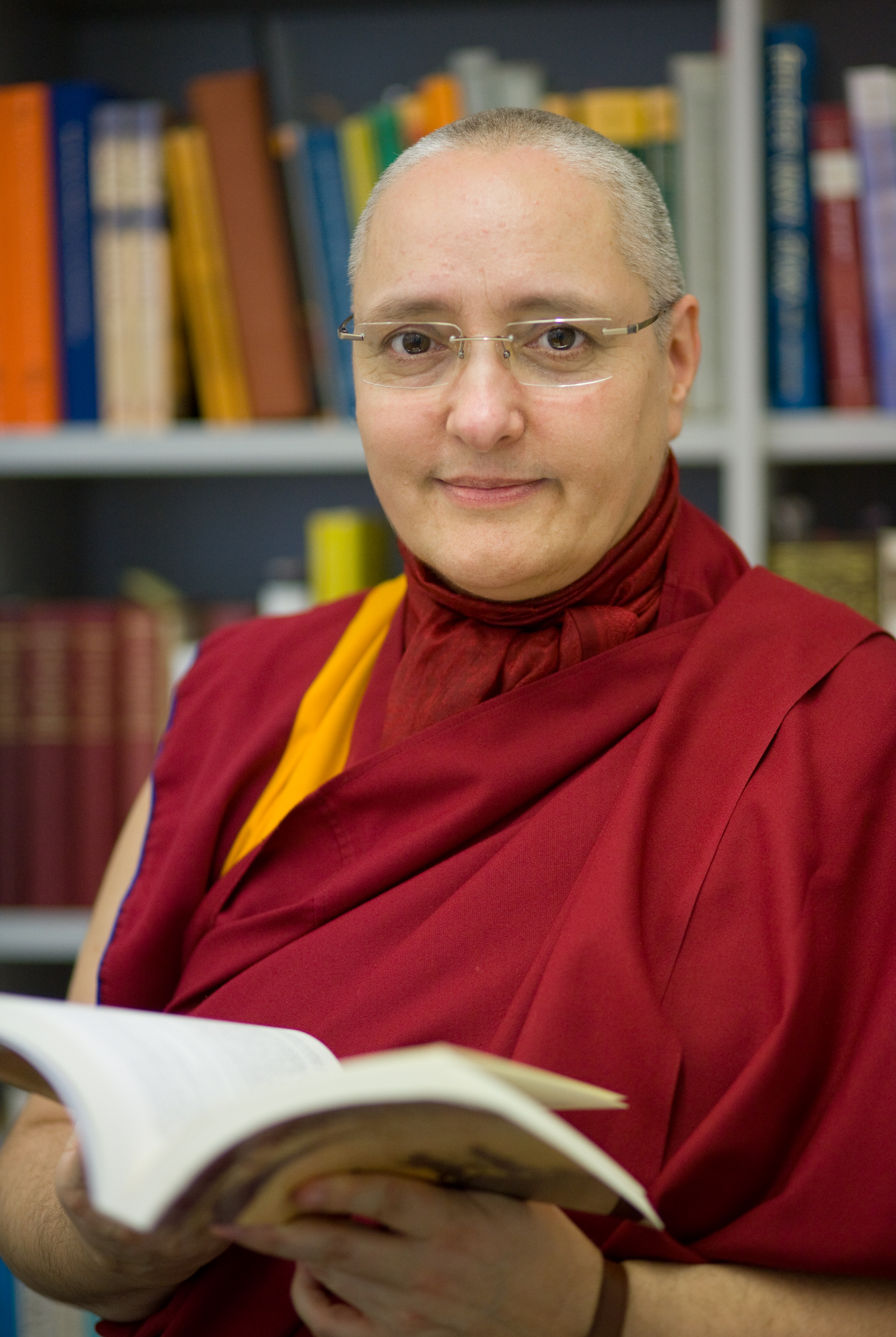
- Roloff
- Born: 1959 (age 66–67); Holzminden, Germany
- Occupation: Buddhist nun
- Website: http://www.carolaroloff.de/

Carola Roloff (born 1959 in Holzminden, Germany) is a Tibetologist, scholar of Buddhism, and Buddhist nun. Since 2025, she is a Senior Research Fellow in Pluralistic Dialogical Religious Education at the University of Hamburg. Under her monastic name Bhiksuni Jampa Tsedroen, she continues to campaign for gender equity and equal rights for Buddhist nuns.

== Early and religious life ==
Born in Holzminden, Germany to a Protestant family, Roloff was active in her local Christian youth group. Doubting the source of suffering, Roloff recalls that she "couldn't get any satisfactory answers from Christian ministers." As a result, she turned to Buddhist philosophy and began her Buddhist studies and life in 1980, aged 21. She travelled to Dharamshala, India in order to study Vajrayana Buddhism and the Tibetan language, before becoming a novice at the age of 22—one of the first Tibetan Buddhist nuns in Germany. Her ordination as a novice was performed by Geshe Thubten Ngawang on 22 September 1981 at the Tibetan Centre Hamburg. Geshe Thubten was also her spiritual teacher until his death in 2003. On 6 December 1985, Roloff received her full ordination into the Dharmaguptaka lineage at the Miao-tung monastery in Kaohsiung, Taiwan. She kept her novice name Jampa Tsedroen. In Tibetan, Jampa means "maitrī" "loving kindness" (Pali: mettā) and "Tsedroen" means "lamp of life". While being ordained in the Dharmagupta tradition, Roloff is practising in the Tibetan Mulasarvastivada tradition.

Following her ordination, Roloff became active in translation, in the management of the Tibetan Centre in Hamburg, and in campaigning for equal opportunities for nuns. As well as English and her native German, she is fluent in Tibetan, Sanskrit, and Pali. With the help of her teacher Geshe Thubten, Roloff translated the sojong vows for bhiksunis into English, thereby greatly aiding Western Tibetan nuns in the ritual. Further aiding the research and study of students around the world, Roloff helped digitise scripture and other Buddhist texts. Roloff studied Tibetology and Indology with a focus on Buddhist Studies at the University of Hamburg, completing her Magister degree in 2003 and earning her PhD with distinction in 2009. Her dissertation was awarded the Karl H. Ditze Prize. From 1981 to 2006, Roloff was responsible for coordinating refugee assistance at the Tibetan Centre Hamburg. She continues to support and teach Buddhist students as part of her ongoing commitment to Buddhist education.

Throughout her academic and spiritual journey, Roloff emphasizes the integration of scholarly work and socially engaged Buddhism, aligning her practice with her commitment to the bodhisattva ideal. In an interview with Vasana Chinvarakorn of the Bangkok Post, she stated, "I feel I haven't practised enough. I've accumulated merits and increased a little bit of wisdom, but still my time for meditation and retreat is not enough." Serving the community, however, is faithful to her bodhisattva vow and is Roloff's priority over her own personal development.

== Female ordination in Buddhism ==
Ordaining female nuns, or bhiksunis, in the Tibetan tradition has been met with resistance from many Tibetan monks. Roloff is determined to change this reluctance to allow women into the tradition. As well as campaigning for a change of opinion, she is instrumental in helping to determine how females can best be accommodated, both in the tradition itself and in sanghas (mutually supportive communities). Fortunately for Roloff, this imposing challenge has been supported by the 14th Dalai Lama. At an international conference for Buddhist women in 1987, Roloff recalls him saying to her, "...'You women have to fight for it [bhikkhuni ordination]. You cannot expect the monks to serve it to you.'..." As well as lecturing and writing on the subject, Roloff conducts research with other monks and nuns to help strengthen their position. The Vinaya scriptures, for example, show that the Buddha accepted the role of women as nuns in search of enlightenment, and Roloff therefore often quotes this text. Her current research focuses also include Buddhist ethics, Buddhist perspectives in religious education, interreligious dialogue, gender equity in Buddhism, and the recognition of Buddhist minorities in Europe.

== Management and advisory board activities ==
Roloff has held several significant academic and advisory positions, including directing a DFG-funded research project on the ordination of Buddhist nuns, serving as a senior researcher in a BMBF-funded European project on religion and dialogue, and as visiting professor of Buddhism and Dialogue in Modern Societies at the Academy of World Religions, University of Hamburg (2018–2025). Roloff is currently a board member of the European Network of Buddhist-Christian Studies (ENBCS) and serves on the advisory board of the German section of the European Society of Women in Theological Research (ESWTR). She is also affiliated with the Numata Centre for Buddhist Studies at the University of Hamburg as a Research Fellow and is a lifelong member of the International Association of Buddhist Studies (IABS).

== Literary works ==
Carola Roloff has authored and edited numerous scholarly publications on Buddhist studies, with a particular focus on Vinaya, gender and ordination, interreligious dialogue, and Buddhist education. Her works include monographs such as Red mda' ba. Buddhist Yoga Scholar of the Fourteenth Century (2009) and The Buddhist Nun's Ordination in the Tibetan Canon (2020), as well as several edited volumes including Dignity and Discipline (2010) and Buddhistischer Religionsunterricht (2023). A full list of her publications is available on her personal website. Relevance of Vinaya in Modern Circumstances was published in 1991 and A Brief Survey of the Vinaya: Its Origin, Transmission, and Arrangement from the Tibetan Point of View with Comparisons to the Theravāda and Dharmagupta Traditions in 1992.

== Recognition ==
In conjunction with the United Nations' International Women's Day, the International Congress for Buddhist Women presented Roloff with the Outstanding Women in Buddhism award, on 7 March 2007, at the United Nations centre in Bangkok.

== See also ==
- Therīgāthā
- Ayya Khema
- Sister Uppalavanna
- Sister Vajirā
- Women in Buddhism
