= Women in Buddhism =

Religious society

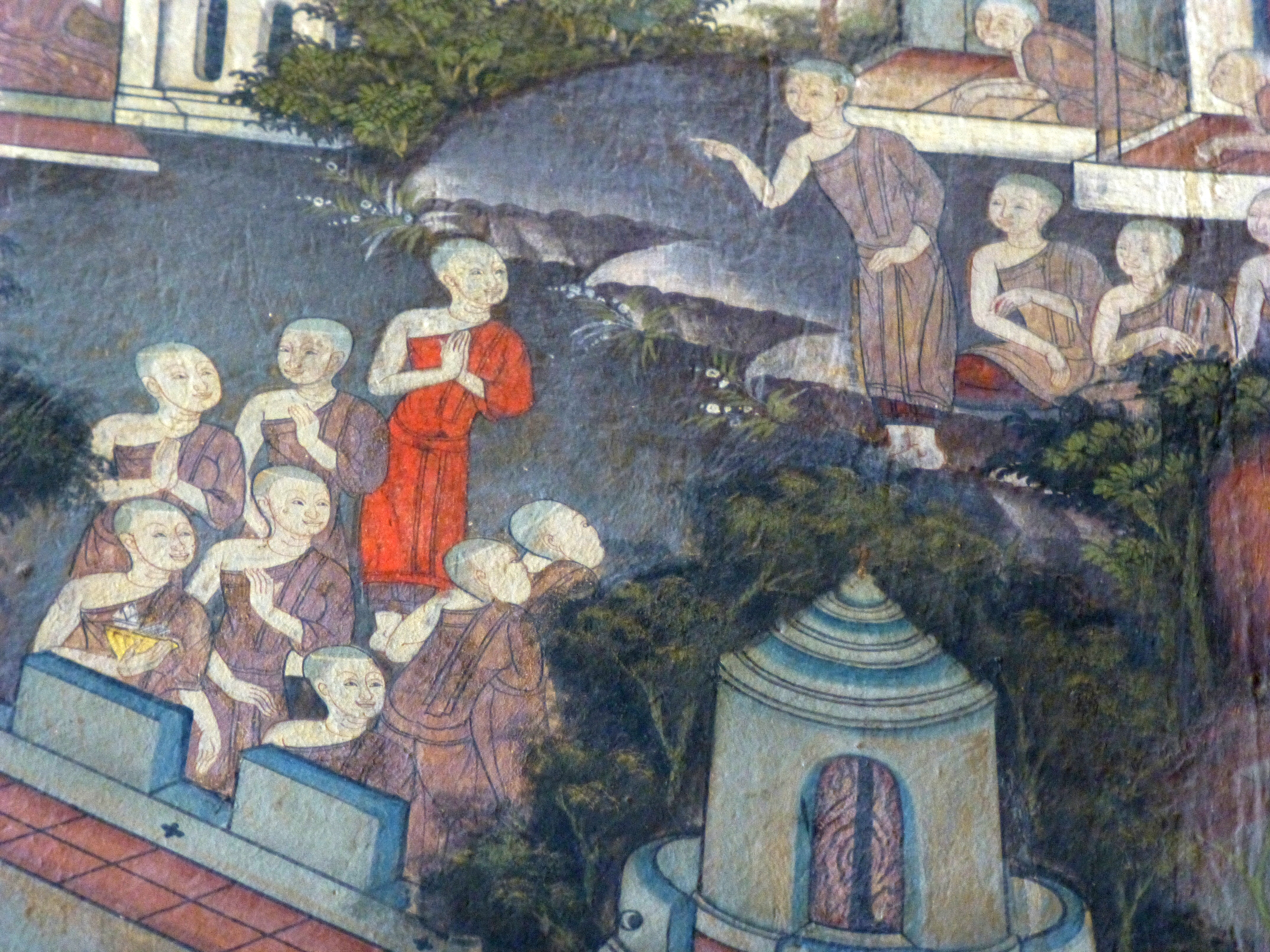
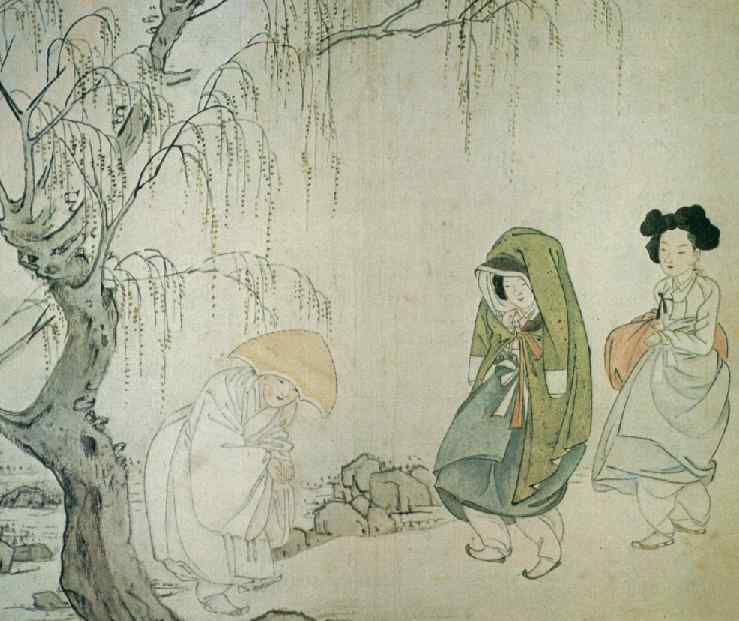
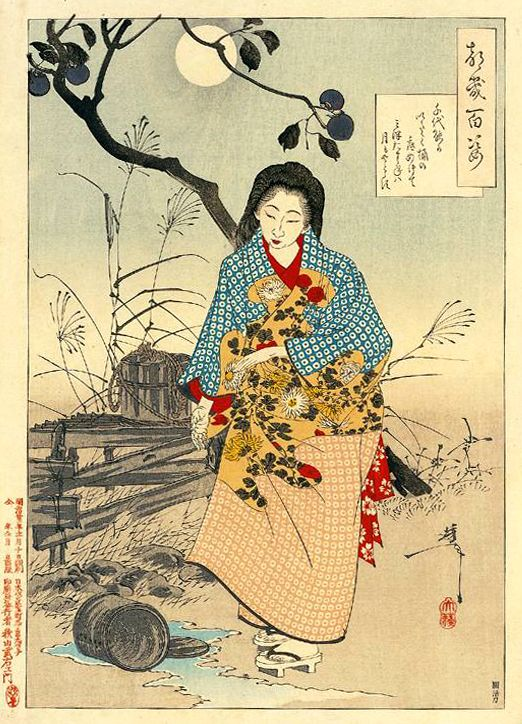
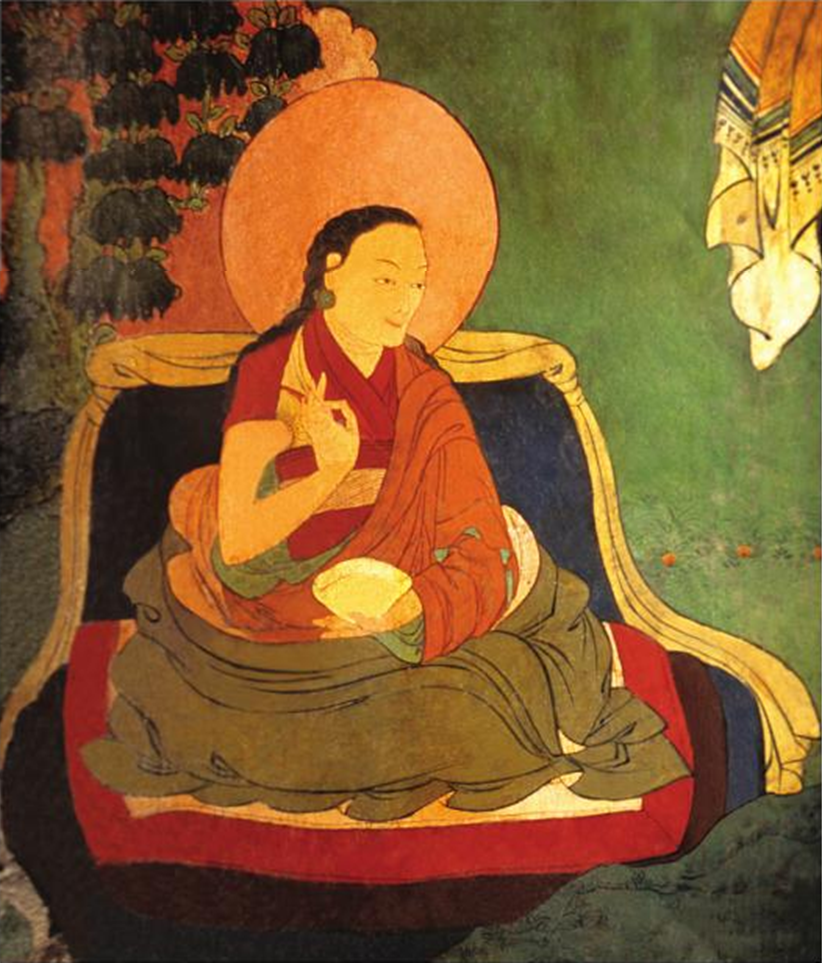
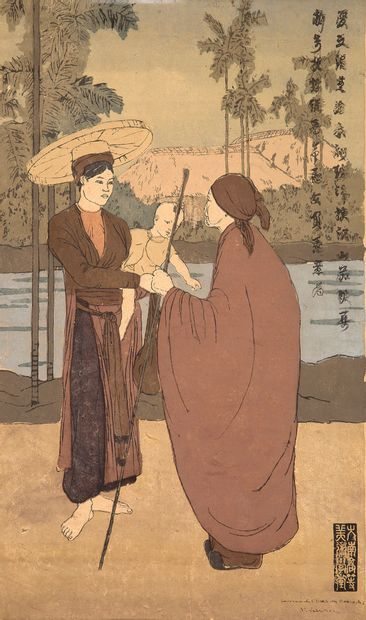
Clockwise from upper left: Mahapajapati Gotami (the first nun), A Korean Buddhist nun, Fukuda Chiyo-ni (a Japanese Buddhist nun and poet), A Vietnamese Buddhist nun, Chökyi Drönma (Tibetan Buddhist reincarnated lama)

Women in Buddhism is a topic that can be approached from varied perspectives including those of theology, history, archaeology, anthropology, and feminism. Topical interests include the theological status of women, the treatment of women in Buddhist societies at home and in public, the history of women in Buddhism, and a comparison of the experiences of women across different forms of Buddhism. As in other religions, the experiences of Buddhist women have varied considerably.

Scholars such as Bernard Faure and Miranda Shaw are in agreement that Buddhist studies is in its infancy in terms of addressing gender issues. Shaw gave an overview of the situation in 1994:

In the case of Indo-Tibetan Buddhism some progress has been made in the areas of women in early Buddhism, monasticism and Mahayana Buddhism. Two articles have seriously broached the subject of women in Indian tantric Buddhism, while somewhat more attention has been paid to Tibetan nuns and lay yoginis.

However Khandro Rinpoche, a female lama in Tibetan Buddhism, downplays the significance of growing attention to the topic:

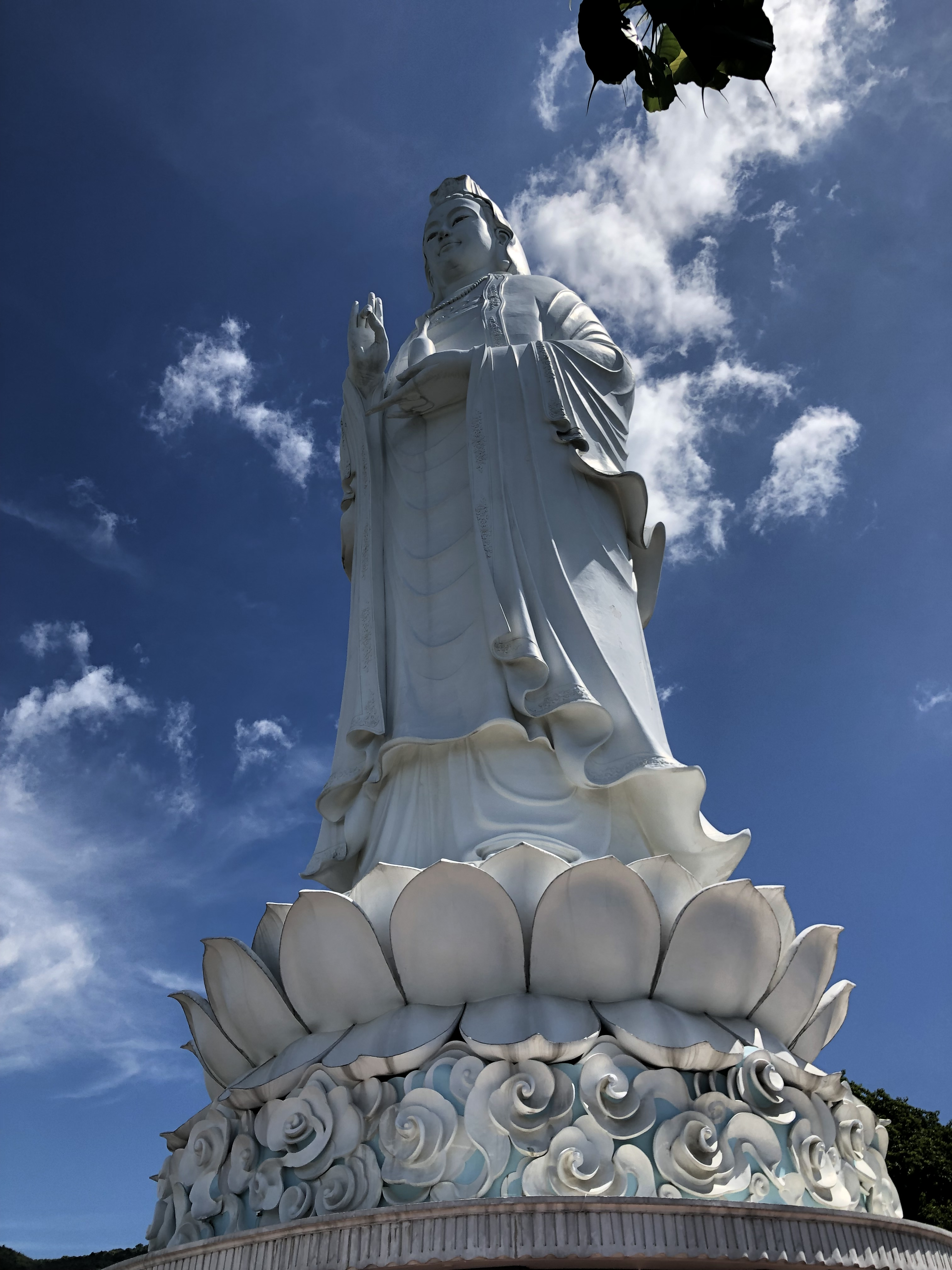
Lady Buddha (Quan Âm), Danang is the largest Buddha statue in Vietnam.

When there is a talk about women and Buddhism, I have noticed that people often regard the topic as something new and different. They believe that women in Buddhism has become an important topic because we live in modern times and so many women are practicing the Dharma now. However, this is not the case. The female sangha has been here for centuries. We are not bringing something new into a 2,500-year-old tradition. The roots are there, and we are simply re-energizing them.

Masatoshi Ueki conducted a comprehensive evaluation of the status of women and gender equality in Buddhism, which was grounded in a diachronic textual analysis of Chinese Buddhist literature from Early Buddhism to the Lotus Sutra. Ueki employed a nuanced interpretation of the terms 'male' and 'female' beyond mere biological characteristics, instead emphasizing their functional roles within society, which he referred to as the 'male principle' or Yang qualities and 'female principle' or Yin qualities. His investigation culminated in the conclusion that Shakyamuni's teachings make no distinction regarding women's enlightenment, thus asserting gender equality in Buddhism.

Based on an assessment of archaeological data, Garima Kaushik states "the marked feminine presence at a number of Buddhist sites in the subcontinent indicate that the Buddhist society was in no way indifferent to the issues of gender and women and strange as it may seem, the subject was part of a larger socio-religious debate within Buddhism. Buddhism was receptive to issues of gender and it was the active participation and agency of the Buddhist women in religious, spiritual and social matters that prevented the society from remaining unresponsive to their presence".

Ueki Masatoshi writes:

The establishment of the male principle in equal measure with the female principle is the natural order of things. They should never exist in a mutually exclusive relationship. They should not be an emphasis on one at the expense of the other, for both are indispensable. ... will the establishment of the true self be a fact of reality for both men and women.

== Timeline of women in Buddhism ==
- 6th century BCE: Mahapajapati Gotami, the aunt and foster mother of Buddha, was the first woman to receive Buddhist ordination.
- 1st century CE: Buddhamitra, a Sarvastivadin nun, recognized as the 9th Indian Patriarch of Zen Buddhism.
- 5th century: Prajñātārā was the twenty-seventh Indian Patriarch of Zen Buddhism and teacher of Bodhidharma. While Prajñātārā has generally been assumed to be male and is listed among the Chan Patriarchs (all of whom are male), 20th century Buddhist practitioners have suggested that Prajñātārā might have been a woman.
- 13th century: The first female Zen master in Japan was the Japanese abbess Mugai Nyodai (1223–1298).
- 1844: Elizabeth Peabody became the first person to translate any Buddhist scripture into English, translating a chapter of the Lotus Sutra from its French translation.
- 1880: Madame Blavatsky and Colonel Olcott became the first Westerners to go for refuge and take precepts, the ceremony by which one traditionally becomes a Buddhist; thus Blavatsky was the first Western woman to do so.
- 1928: A secular law was passed in Thailand banning women's full ordination in Buddhism. However, this law was revoked some time after Varanggana Vanavichayen became the first female monk to be ordained in Thailand in 2002.
- 1966: Freda Bedi, a British woman, became the first Western woman to take ordination in Tibetan Buddhism.
- 1971: Voramai, also called Ta Tao Fa Tzu, became the first fully ordained Thai woman in the Mahayana lineage in Taiwan and turned her family home into a monastery.
- 1976: Karuna Dharma became the first fully ordained female member of the Buddhist monastic community in the U.S.
- 1981: Ani Pema Chodron is an American woman who was ordained as a bhikkhuni (a fully ordained Buddhist nun) in a lineage of Tibetan Buddhism in 1981. Pema Chödrön was the first American woman to be ordained as a Buddhist nun in the Tibetan Buddhist tradition.
- 1988: Jetsunma Ahkon Lhamo, an American woman formerly called Catharine Burroughs, became the first Western woman to be named a reincarnate lama.
- 1996: Through the efforts of Sakyadhita, an International Buddhist Women Association, ten Sri Lankan women were ordained as bhikkhunis in Sarnath, India.
- 1996: Subhana Barzaghi Roshi became the Diamond Sangha's first female roshi (Zen teacher) when she received transmission on March 9, 1996, in Australia. In the ceremony Subhana also became the first female roshi in the lineage of Robert Aitken Roshi.
- 1997 Venerable Wuling, an American New York woman born in 1946. Ordained in Taiwan and follows the Chinese Pure Land school of Mahayana Buddhism tradition.
- 1998: Sherry Chayat, born in Brooklyn, became the first American woman to receive transmission in the Rinzai school of Buddhism.
- 1998: After 900 years without such ordinations, Sri Lanka again began to ordain women as fully ordained Buddhist nuns, called bhikkhunis.
- 2002: Khenmo Drolma, an American woman, became the first bhikkhuni (fully ordained Buddhist nun) in the Drikung Kagyu lineage of Buddhism, traveling to Taiwan to be ordained.
- 2002: A 55-year-old Buddhist nun, Varanggana Vanavichayen, became the first female monk to be ordained in Thailand. She was ordained by a Sri Lankan woman monk in the presence of a male Thai monk. Theravada scriptures, as interpreted in Thailand, require that for a woman to be ordained as a monk, the ceremony must be attended by both a male and female monk. Some time after this a secular law in Thailand banning women's full ordination in Buddhism which had been passed in 1928 was revoked.
- 2003: Ayya Sudhamma Bhikkhuni became the first American-born woman to gain bhikkhuni ordination in the Theravada school in Sri Lanka.
- 2003: On February 28, 2003, Dhammananda Bhikkhuni, formerly known as Chatsumarn Kabilsingh, became the first Thai woman to receive full ordination as a Theravada nun. She was ordained in Sri Lanka.
- 2003: Saccavadi and Gunasari were ordained as bhikkhunis in Sri Lanka, thus becoming the first female Burmese novices in modern times to receive higher ordination in Sri Lanka.
- 2004: Khenmo Drolma, an American woman, became the first westerner of either sex to be installed as an abbot in the Drikung Kagyu lineage of Buddhism, being installed as the abbot of the Vajra Dakini Nunnery in Vermont (America's first Tibetan Buddhist nunnery) in 2004.
- 2004: U.S. Navy LTJG Jeanette Shin became the first Buddhist chaplain, male or female, in the U.S. Military.
- 2006: Merle Kodo Boyd, born in Texas, became the first African-American woman ever to receive Dharma transmission in Zen Buddhism.
- 2007: Myokei Caine-Barrett, born and ordained in Japan, became the first female Nichiren priest in her affiliated Nichiren Order of North America.
- 2009: The first Bhikkhuni ordination in Australia in the Theravada Buddhist tradition was performed in Perth, Australia, on 22 October 2009 at Bodhinyana Monastery. Abbess Vayama together with Nirodha, Seri, and Hasapanna were ordained as Bhikkhunis by a dual Sangha act of Bhikkhus and Bhikkhunis in full accordance with the Pali Vinaya.
- 2010: The Soto Zen Buddhist Association (SZBA) approved a document honoring the women ancestors in the Zen tradition at its biannual meeting on October 8, 2010. Female ancestors, dating back 2,500 years from India, China, and Japan, could thus be included in the curriculum, ritual, and training offered to Western Zen students.
- 2010: The first Tibetan Buddhist nunnery in America (Vajra Dakini Nunnery in Vermont), offering novice ordination in the Drikung Kagyu lineage of Buddhism, was officially consecrated.
- 2010: In Northern California, four novice nuns were given the full bhikkhuni ordination in the Thai Therevada tradition, which included the double ordination ceremony. Bhante Gunaratana and other monks and nuns were in attendance. It was the first such ordination ever in the Western hemisphere. The following month, more full ordinations were completed in Southern California, led by Walpola Piyananda and other monks and nuns. The bhikkhunis ordained in Southern California were Lakshapathiye Samadhi (born in Sri Lanka), Cariyapanna, Susila, Sammasati (all three born in Vietnam), and Uttamanyana (born in Myanmar).
- 2011: In April 2011, the Institute for Buddhist Dialectical Studies (IBD) in Dharamsala, India, conferred the degree of geshema (a Tibetan Buddhist academic degree) on Kelsang Wangmo, a German nun, thus making her the world's first woman to receive that degree.
- 2012: Emma Slade, a British woman, became the first Western woman to be ordained as a Buddhist nun in Bhutan.
- 2013: Tibetan women were able to take the geshe exams for the first time. Geshe is a Tibetan Buddhist academic degree for monks and nuns.
- 2015: The first bhikkhuni ordination in Germany, the Theravada bhikkhuni ordination of German nun Samaneri Dhira, occurred on June 21, 2015, at Anenja Vihara.
- 2015: The first Theravada ordination of bhikkhunis in Indonesia after more than a thousand years occurred at Wisma Kusalayani in Lembang, Bandung. Those ordained included Vajiradevi Sadhika Bhikkhuni from Indonesia, Medha Bhikkhuni from Sri Lanka, Anula Bhikkhuni from Japan, Santasukha Santamana Bhikkhuni from Vietnam, Sukhi Bhikkhuni and Sumangala Bhikkhuni from Malaysia, and Jenti Bhikkhuni from Australia.
- 2016: Twenty Tibetan Buddhist nuns became the first Tibetan women to earn geshema degrees.
- 2022: Terri Omori is appointed the first female president of the 12,000 member Buddhist Churches of America.
- 2022: The official lineage of Tibetan Buddhist bhikkhunis recommenced on 23 June 2022 in Bhutan when 144 nuns, most of them Bhutanese, were fully ordained.

== Women in early Buddhism ==
From the earliest days of Buddhism, women were permitted to join the monastic community and participate in it, although there were certain special provisions for them known as ''The Eight Garudhammas''. Susan Murcott argues that "The nun's sangha was a radical experiment for its time." However, as Gurmeet Kaur writes, "Neither in society nor the monastic order are women recognized as spiritual leaders above the authority of men. Bhikkuṇī are systematically taught and told to follow the footsteps of Bhikkhu through an institutional mechanism that is so strong that whosoever tries to challenge it faces backlashes from the Buddhist community."

According to Diana Paul, the traditional view of women in Early Buddhism was that they were inferior. Rita Gross agrees that "a misogynist strain is found in early Indian Buddhism. But the presence of some clearly misogynist doctrines does not mean that the whole of ancient Indian Buddhism was misogynist."

According to foundational texts of Buddhism such as the Pali Canon, Gautama Buddha sometimes displayed a negative view of women: "One must beware of women. For every wise woman, there are a thousand foolish or wicked women. The nature of a woman is as unclear as the path a fish takes in water. She is wild and underhanded like a bandit and rarely speaks the truth; for her, truth and falsehood are the same." According to some scriptures and traditions, the Buddha believed that a person's karma had to be especially bad in their past lives in order to be reborn as a woman, thus making it that much harder for them to discover enlightenment. The Buddha initially refused to induct women into the monastic community. His maternal aunty and step-mother, Mahaprajapati Gautami was refused three times by the Buddha to be ordained as a nun once her husband, the king, died. On the fourth time, the Buddha's principle disciple, Ananda, asked on Gautami's behalf and the Buddha reluctantly permitted women to be ordained.

There are statements in Buddhist scripture that appear to be misogynist, such as depicting women as obstructers of men's spiritual progress or the notion that being born female leaves one with less opportunity for spiritual progress. However, in societies where men have always been the authorities and the ones given wider choices, a negative view of women might be seen as simply reflecting the empirical political reality. Furthermore, the religious literature is more likely to be addressed to men. Hence we find the Buddhist emphasis on renunciation of sensual desires expressed in terms of the male's attachment to women more frequently than we find the reverse. The mix of positive attitudes to femininity with blatantly negative sentiment has led many writers to characterise early Buddhism's attitude to women as deeply ambivalent.

=== Foremost female disciples of Gautama Buddha ===
The Buddha provided the names of women, both mendicant and lay, who were exemplars of attainment and character. These are listed in the Pañcama Vagga and Chaṭṭha Vagga of the Aṅguttara Nikāya respectively:

- Foremost in seniority: Mahāpajāpatī Gotamī
- Foremost in great wisdom: Khemā
- Foremost in psychic power: Uppalavaṇṇā
- Foremost in memorizing the Vinaya: Paṭācārā
- Foremost in speaking the Dhamma: Dhammadinna
- Foremost in absorption: Sundari Nandā
- Foremost in energy: Soṇā
- Foremost in clairvoyance: Sakulā
- Foremost in swift insight: Bhaddā Kuṇḍalakesā
- Foremost in recollecting past lives: Bhaddā Kāpilānī
- Foremost in great insight: Bhaddakaccānā
- Foremost in wearing coarse robes: Kisāgotamī
- Foremost in faith: Siṅgālakamātā

Foremost of laywomen

- Foremost in first going for refuge: Sujātā Seniyadhītā
- Foremost as donor: Visākhā
- Foremost in learning: Khujjuttarā
- Foremost who dwells in metta: Sāmāvatī
- Foremost in absorption: Uttarānandamātā
- Foremost in giving fine things: Suppavāsā Koliyadhītā
- Foremost in caring for the sick: Suppiyā
- Foremost in experiential confidence: Kātiyānī
- Foremost in reliability: Nakulamātā
- Foremost in confidence based on oral transmission: Kāḷī of Kuraraghara

== Women's spiritual attainment in Buddhism ==
The various schools and traditions within Buddhism hold different views as to the possibilities of women's spiritual attainments. One significant strand emphasizes that in terms of spiritual attainment, women and men have equal spiritual capabilities and that women not only can, but also in many cases have, attained spiritual liberation. Such a perspective is found in a number of sources of different periods, including early Buddhist literature in the Theravāda tradition, Mahāyāna sūtras, and tantric writings. There are stories of women and even children who attained enlightenment during the time of the Buddha. Furthermore, Buddhist doctrines do not differentiate between men and women since everyone, regardless of gender, status, or age, is subject to old age, injury, illness, and mortality; thus the suffering and impermanence that mark conditioned existence apply to all.

=== Limitations on women's spiritual attainment in Buddhism ===
According to Bernard Faure, "Like most clerical discourses, Buddhism is indeed relentlessly misogynist, but as far as misogynist discourses go, it is one of the most flexible and open to multiplicity and contradiction." Faure states that the ancient and medieval Buddhist texts and traditions, like other religions, were almost always unfavorable or discriminatory against women, in terms of their ability to pursue Noble Eightfold Path, attain Buddhahood and nirvana. This issue of presumptions about the "female religious experience" is found in Indian texts, in translations into non-Indian languages, and in regional non-Indian commentaries written in East Asian kingdoms such as those in China, Japan and southeast Asia. Yet, like other Indian religions, exceptions and veneration of females is found in Indian Buddhist texts, and female Buddhist deities are likewise described in positive terms and with reverence. Nevertheless, females are seen as polluted with menstruation, sexual intercourse, death and childbirth. Rebirth as a woman is seen in the Buddhist texts as a result of part of past karma, and inferior than that of a man.

In the Buddhist tradition, positions of apparently worldly power are often a reflection of the spiritual achievements of the individual. For example, gods live in higher realms than human beings and therefore have a certain level of spiritual attainment. Cakravartins and Buddhas are also more spiritually advanced than ordinary human beings. However, as the Taiwanese nun Heng-Ching Shih states, women in Buddhism are said to have five obstacles, including being incapable of becoming a Brahma King, Sakra, King Mara, Cakravartin or Buddha. In the Five Obstacles theory (Note: The Lotus Sutra, for example, asserts "A woman's body is filthy, it is not a Dharma-receptacle. How can you attain unexcelled bodhi?... Also a woman's body even then has five obstacles.) of Buddhism, a woman is required to attain rebirth as a man before she can adequately pursue the Eightfold Path and reach perfect Buddhahood. The Lotus Sutra similarly presents the story of the Dragon King's daughter, who desires to achieve perfect enlightenment. The Sutra states that, "Her female organs vanished, the male organs became visible, then she appeared as a bodhisattva". In Chinese and Japanese Buddhist communities, since the 19th century, in addition to these five obstacles, women have been recognized as having three subordinations, namely, the need for women to obey their parents in youth, their husbands in middle age, and their oldest son in old age, which inherits from the Chinese Confucian traditional texts of the Book of Rites, the Kongzi Jiayu, and the Indian Mānavadharmasāstra.

Some scholars, such as Kenneth Doo Young Lee, interpret the Lotus Sutra to imply that "women were capable of gaining salvation", either after they first turned into a man, or being reborn in Pure Land realm after following the Path. Peter Harvey lists many Sutras that suggest "having faded out the mind-set of a woman and developed the mind-set of a man, he was born in his present male form", and who then proceeds to follow the Path and became an Arahant. Among Mahayana texts, there is a sutra dedicated to the concept of how a person might be born as a woman. The traditional assertion is that women are more prone to harboring feelings of greed, hatred and delusion than a man. The Buddha responds to this assumption by teaching the method of moral development through which a woman can achieve rebirth as a man.

According to Wei-Yi Cheng, the Pali Canon is silent about women's inferior karma, but have statements and stories that mention the Eightfold Path while advocating female subordination. For example, a goddess reborn in the heavenly realm asserts:

When I was born a human being among men I was a daughter-in-law in a wealthy family. I was without anger, obedient to my husband, diligent on the Observance (days). When I was born a human being, young and innocent, with a mind of faith, I delighted my lord. By day and by night I acted to please. Of old (...). On the fourteenth, fifteenth and eighth (days) of the bright fortnight and on a special day of the fortnight well connected with the eightfold (precepts) I observed the Observance day with a mind of faith, was one who was faring according to Dhamma with zeal in my heart...

— Vimanavatthu III.3.31, Wei-Yi Cheng

Such examples, states Wei-Yi Cheng, include conflating statements about spiritual practice (Eightfold Path, Dhamma) and "obedience to my husband" and "by day and by night I acted to please", thus implying unquestioned obedience of male authority and female subjugation. Such statements are not isolated, but common, such as in section II.13 of the Petavatthu which teaches that a woman had to "put away the thoughts of a woman" as she pursued the Path and this merit obtained her a better rebirth; the Jataka stories of the Pali Canon have numerous such stories, as do the Chinese Sutta that assert "undesirability of womanhood". Modern Buddhist nuns have applied Buddhist doctrines such as Pratītyasamutpāda to explain their disagreement with women's inferior karma in past lives as implied in Samyutta Nikaya 13, states Wei-Yi Cheng, while asserting that the Path can be practiced by either gender and "both men and women can become arhant". This is based on the statement of Gautama Buddha in the Bahudhātuka-sutta of the Majjhima Nikaya in the Pali Canon that it is impossible that a woman should be "the perfectly rightfully Enlightened One", "the Universal Monarch", "the King of Gods", "the King of Death" or "Brahmaa". Earlier limitations on attainment of Buddhahood by women were abolished in the Lotus Sutra, which opens a direct path to enlightenment for women equal to that of men. According to Nichiren" "Only in the Lotus Sutra do we read that a woman who embraces this sutra not only surpasses all other women but surpasses all men".

=== Women and Buddhahood ===
Although early Buddhist texts such as the Cullavagga section of the Vinaya Pitaka of the Pali Canon contain statements from Gautama Buddha, speaking to the fact that a woman can attain enlightenment, it is also clearly stated in the Bahudhātuka-sutta that there could never be a female Buddha.

In Theravada Buddhism, the modern school based on the Buddhist philosophy of the earliest dated texts, achieving Buddhahood is a rare event. The focus of practice is primarily on attaining Arhatship, and the Pali Canon has examples of both male and female Arhats who attained nirvana. Yasodharā, the former wife of Buddha Shakyamuni and mother of Rahula, is said to have become an arhat after joining the Bhikkhuni order of Buddhist nuns. In Mahayana schools, Buddhahood is the universal goal for Mahayana practitioners. The Mahayana sutras maintain that a woman can become enlightened, only not in female form. For example, the Bodhisattvabhūmi, dated to the 4th century, states that a woman about to attain enlightenment will be reborn as a male. According to Miranda Shaw, "this belief had negative implications for women insofar as it communicated the insufficiency of the female but never a woman body as a locus of enlightenment".

Some Theravada sutras state that it is impossible for a woman to be a bodhisattva, which is someone on their way to Buddhahood. A bodhisattva can only be a human (that is, a man). These sutras do not deny that women can become awakened, but they are ineligible to lead a Buddhist community. If the aspiration to Buddhahood has been made and a Buddha of the time confirms it, it is impossible to be reborn as a woman. An appropriate aim is for women to aspire to be reborn as male. They can become a male by moral actions and sincere aspiration to maleness. Being born a female is a result of bad karma.

However, the Jataka tales (stories of the Buddha's past lives as a bodhisattva within the Theravada canon) mention that the Buddha spent one of his past lives as a princess. This is directly contradictory to the assertion that a bodhisattva cannot be born a female.

The appearance of female Buddhas can be found in the tantric iconography of the Vajrayana practice path of Buddhism. Sometimes they are the consorts of the main yidam of a meditation mandala but Buddhas such as Vajrayogini, Tara and Simhamukha appear as the central figures of tantric sadhana in their own right. Vajrayana Buddhism also recognizes many female yogini practitioners as achieving the full enlightenment of a Buddha, Miranda Shaw as an example cites sources referring to "Among the students of the adept Naropa, reportedly two hundred men and one thousand women attained complete enlightenment". Yeshe Tsogyal, one of the five tantric consorts of Padmasambhava is an example of a woman (Yogini) recognized as a female Buddha in the Vajrayana tradition. According to Karmapa lineage however Tsogyel has attained Buddhahood in that very life. On the website of the Karmapa, the head of the Karma Kagyu school of Tibetan Buddhism, it is stated that Yeshe Tsogyal—some thirty years before transcending worldly existence—finally emerged from an isolated meditation retreat, (c.796-805 AD), as "a fully enlightened Buddha" (samyak-saṃbuddha).

There are predictions from Sakyamuni Buddha to be found in the thirteenth chapter of the Mahayana Lotus Sutra, referring to future attainments of Mahapajapati and Yasodharā.

In the 20th century Tenzin Palmo, a Tibetan Buddhist nun in the Drukpa Lineage of the Kagyu school, stated "I have made a vow to attain Enlightenment in the female form—no matter how many lifetimes it takes".

=== The divine feminine as Buddha Locana in Tantrism ===
The divine feminine is connected to the story of Gautama Buddha's enlightenment under the bodhi tree. When Mara appears to Gautama and questions his worthiness to become the Awakened one, Gautama calls upon Mother Earth to witness his merit throughout countless previous lifetimes by touching the ground. This gesture is known as the bhūmisparśa or "earth witnessing" mudra. While Mother Earth is associated with the Goddess Prithvi, Alex Wayman asserts that the divine feminine in Tantra is connected with a plethora of terms including prajna ('insight'), yogini ('female yogin'), vidya ('know how'), devi ('goddess'), matr ('mother'), matrka ('mother' or 'letters'), and mudra ('seal' or 'gesture'). The anthropomorphic expression of Mother Earth in Gautama's enlightenment story developed into the figure of Buddha Locana ("eyes") in Tantrism. As one of the Five Buddha Mothers that represents the purity of the element of earth, Buddha Locana is a fully enlightened female Buddha and is the consort of Akshobya according to the Guhyasamāja Tantra or "Secret Assembly." In the Guhyasamāja mandala, Buddha Locana occupies a higher status than Gautama Buddha as he was not able to attain enlightenment without her being called as a witness. Her title as a Buddha Mother, however, should not be mistaken as a child birthing figure in this context. Rather, the role of Buddha Mother refers to her primordial status. As a metaphorical form, Buddha Locana represents the all-seeing eye and mother figure that watches over humanity. Alex Wayman suggests that the metaphorical symbolism of the earth represents the power of arya-prajna, which provides the means to destroy illusion. The primordial nature and central significance of Buddha Locana can be seen in her placement in the mandala, as she represents the prajna of Vairocana Buddha, who in turn is the dharmakaya of Gautama Buddha. Owing to this classification, Buddha Locana represents the high status of the divine feminine in Tantra, a status that surpasses the masculine principle.

=== Notable female tulkus ===
In the fifteenth century CE, Princess Chokyi-dronme (Wylie: Chos-kyi sgron-me) was recognized as the embodiment of the meditation deity and female Buddha in the Vajrayana tradition, Vajravarahi. Chokyi-dronme became known as Samding Dorje Phagmo (Wylie: bSam-lding rDo-rje phag-mo) and began a line of female tulkus, reincarnate lamas. At present, the twelfth of this line lives in Tibet.

Another female tulku lineage, that of Shugseb Jetsun Rinpoche (Wylie: Shug-gseb rJe-btsun Rin-po-che) (c. 1865 – 1951), began in the late nineteenth century CE. While she received teachings of all the Tibetan schools, Shugseb Jetsun Rinpoche was particularly known for holding a lineage of Chöd, the meditation practice of offering one's own body for the benefit of others. At the start of the twentieth century, Shugsheb Jetsun Rinpoche—also called Ani Lochen Chönyi Zangmo—founded the Shuksep or Shugsep (Wylie: shug gseb) nunnery located thirty miles from Lhasa on the slopes of Mount Gangri Thökar. It became one of the largest and most famous nunneries in Tibet. Shugsep Nunnery, part of the Nyingma school, has been re-established in exile in Gambhir Ganj, India. The nuns of Shugsep continue their practices, including Longchen Nyingtig and Chöd.

The Third Drubwang Padma Norbu ("Penor") Rinpoche, 11th Throneholder of Palyul Monastery, former Supreme Head of the Nyingma tradition, officially recognized the American woman Ahkon Lhamo in 1987 as the tulku of Genyenma Ahkon Lhamo during her visit to his Namdroling Monastery in Bylakuppe, Karnataka, India. As is customary, Penor Rinpoche sought confirmation of his recognition before announcing it. He received it from both Dilgo Khyentse Rinpoche (1910–91), the then Supreme Head of the Nyingma tradition who was on a teaching visit to Namdroling at the time, and the most senior Palyul tulku, the Second Dzongnang Jampal Lodro Rinpoche (d. 8/87).

== Buddhist ordination of women ==
Gautama Buddha first ordained women as nuns five years after his enlightenment and five years after first ordaining men into the sangha. The first Buddhist nun was his aunt and foster mother Mahapajapati Gotami. Bhikkhunis have to follow the eight rules of respect, which are vows called The Eight Garudhammas. According to Peter Harvey "The Buddha's apparent hesitation on this matter is reminiscent of his hesitation on whether to teach at all," something he only does after persuasion from various devas. The ordination of women in Buddhism is and has always been practiced in some Buddhist regions, such as East Asia, is being revived in some countries such as Sri Lanka, and is newly beginning in some Western countries to which Buddhism has recently spread, such as the United States. As Buddhism spreads, its prevalence in Mahayana countries grows in popularity as well despite the decrease in Theravada Buddhist nuns. As William Nadeau explains in his book Asian Religions a Cultural Perspective, "In the Mahayana countries, however, the nuns' order remains strong, particularly in Tibet and in Chinese speaking communities."

== Family life in Buddhism ==
In the Anguttara Nikaya (5:33), the Buddha tells future wives that they should be obedient to their husbands, please them, and not make them angry through their own desires.

Furthermore, the Buddha offers advice to married women in the Anguttara Nikaya (7:59; IV 91–94), where he describes seven types of wives. The first three types are destined for unhappiness, while the last four, as they are imbued with long-term self-control, are destined to be happy. These latter wives are characterised as caretakers (motherly-wife), companions (friend-wife) and submissives (sister-wife and slave-wife).

According to Diana Paul, Buddhism inherited a view of women whereby if they are not represented as mothers, then they are portrayed as either lustful temptresses or as evil incarnate.

=== Motherhood ===
The status of motherhood in Buddhism has also traditionally reflected the Buddhist perspective that dukkha, or suffering, is a major characteristic of human existence. In her book on the Therigatha collection of stories of women arhats from the Pali Canon, Susan Murcott states: "Though this chapter is about motherhood, all of the stories and poems share another theme—grief. The mothers of this chapter were motivated to become Buddhist nuns by grief over the death of their children."

However, motherhood in Early Buddhism could also be a valued activity in its own right. Queen Maya, the mother of Gautama Buddha, the founder of Buddhism, had a certain following, especially in Lumbini, where she gave birth to him. Since Maya died some days after his birth, Gautama Buddha was brought up by a fostermother, his mother's sister Mahapajapati, who also had two children of her own. She became the first Buddhist nun. Both of her children, her son Nanda and her daughter Sundari Nanda joined the Buddhist sangha of monastics. The wife of Gautama Buddha, Yasodhara, was the mother of one son named Rahula, meaning "fetter", who became a Buddhist monk at the age of seven and Yasodhara also eventually became a nun.

One of the attractions for women in Vajrayana Buddhism of following the path of a yogini rather than that of a bhikkhuni nun was the opportunity to practice amidst family life with a husband or spiritual consort and possibly have children. Moreover, yoginis, unlike nuns, were not obliged to shave their hair. Machig Labdrön followed such a path, living in a monastery for a while but later leaving to unite with Topabhadra as her consort. According to Machig's namthar he cared for the children while she practiced and taught. Some of Machig's children followed her on the spiritual path, becoming accomplished yogins themselves. Tsultrim Allione, a recognised emanation of Machig Labdron, herself was a nun for four years but left to marry and have children. She has spoken of the contribution motherhood has made to her practice:

...in Buddhism the image of the mother as the embodiment of compassion is used a lot. She'll do anything for the children. As a mother I felt that depth of love and commitment and having somebody who I really would give my own life for—it was very powerful to have that kind of relationship. I also felt that I didn't really grow up until I had my children. There were ways that maturity was demanded of me and having children brought forth that maturity. So I wouldn't say my children were an inspiration in the sense of what I thought would have been a spiritual inspiration before I had children. More so I think meeting the challenges of motherhood with what I had learned made my practice very rich.

=== Romantic love, sexual conduct and marriage ===
In general, "While Buddhism regards the celibate monastic life as the higher ideal, it also recognizes the importance of marriage as a social institution." Some guidelines for marriage are offered. Although Buddhist practice varies considerably among its various schools, marriage is one of the few concepts specifically mentioned in the context of Śīla, the Buddhist formulation of core facets of spiritual discipline. The fundamental code of Buddhist ethics, The Five Precepts contains an admonishment against sexual misconduct, although what constitutes misconduct from the perspective of a particular school of Buddhism varies widely depending on the local culture, Although a foundational concept to be found in East Asian medicine and social philosophy is the conservation of Jing or essence, as over indulgence in sexual desires or activity is seen to reduce the life span of a human being, as it is understood culturally to be the root cause to illness, disease and suffering.

In Early Buddhism, the Sigalovada Sutta of the Digha Nikaya in the Pali Canon describes the respect that one is expected to give to one's spouse. However, since the ideal of Early Buddhism is renunciation, it can be seen from examples such as the story of the monk Nanda and his wife Janapada Kalyāni that striving for the bliss of Nirvana is valued above romantic love and marriage. Despite having married her just that day, encouraged by his cousin Gautama Buddha, Nanda left his wife to become a bhikkhu in the Buddhist Sangha. In stories like this from the Pali Canon, romantic love is generally perceived as part of attachment to samsara, the endless cycle of rebirth. Susan Murcott has pointed out that Early Buddhist attitudes to romantic love and marriage generally reflect the Brahmanic ideals of India at the time... including the recent rise of the renunciate ideal and the associated decline in the status of romantic love and marriage.

In Vajrayana Buddhism, a sexual relationship with a consort is seen in a technical way as being a spiritual practice in anuttarayoga tantra intended to allow the practitioners to attain realizations and attain enlightenment. The union of tantric consorts is depicted in the yab-yum iconography of meditation deities.

== Views of male Buddhist religious leaders about women ==
=== The 14th Dalai Lama ===
The Dalai Lama spoke at a conference on Women in Buddhism at the University of Hamburg in 2007:

Warfare has traditionally been carried out primarily by men since they seem better physically equipped for aggressive behavior. Women, on the other hand, tend to be more caring and more sensitive to others' discomfort and pain. Although men and women have the same potentials for aggression and warm-heartedness, they differ in which of the two more easily manifests. Thus, if the majority of world leaders were women, perhaps there would be less danger of war and more cooperation on the basis of global concern. I sympathize with feminists, but they must not merely shout. They must exert efforts to make positive contributions to society.

In 2009, at the National Civil Rights Museum in Memphis, Tennessee, he said: "I call myself a feminist. Isn't that what you call someone who fights for women's rights?"

He also said that by nature, women are more compassionate "based on their biology and ability to nurture and birth children." He called on women to "lead and create a more compassionate world," citing the good works of nurses and mothers.

In 2007 he said that the next Dalai Lama could possibly be a woman, remarking "If a woman reveals herself as more useful the lama could very well be reincarnated in this form".

In 2010 he stated that "twenty or thirty years ago", when discussing whether a woman could be a Dalai Lama in the future, he said yes but "I also said half-jokingly that if the Dalai Lama's reincarnation is female, she must be very attractive. The reason is so that she will have more influence on others. If she is an ugly female, she won't be very effective, will she?"

During a 2014 interview with Larry King when asked if he thought we will ever see a female Dalai Lama he stated "Yes! That's very possible." he recalled telling a reporter in Paris many years ago that it is possible mentioning that there are some female Lama's in history dating "...six or seven centuries ago, so it is nothing new." He then recalled joking with the reporter, "If female Dalai Lama come, that female must be very, very attractive. [It's] More useful"

In 2015 he repeated this anecdote during an interview with the BBC on refugees. When asked if the Dalai Lama could be a woman he answered "Yes". Recalling again an interview in Paris the possibility he said, "I mentioned, Why not? The female biologically [has] more potential to show affection and compassion...therefore I think female[s] should take more important role and then—I told the reporter—if a female does come her face should be very, very attractive." The interviewer Clive Myrie then asked if a female Dalai Lama must be attractive, he followed up, "I mean. If female Dalai Lama come, then that female must be attractive. Otherwise not much use." Myrie replied "You're joking, I'm assuming. Or you're not joking?" to which The Dalai Lama insisted "No. True!". The Dalai Lama then pointed to his own face, stating that some people think he is very attractive and continued to laugh.

== Buddhist scripture about women ==
=== Mallikā Sutta ===
In the Mallikā Sutta of the Pali Canon, King Pasenadi expresses disappointment when Queen Mallikā gives birth to a daughter instead of a son. In Bhikkhu Sujato's translation of the Sutta, the Buddha responds to this disposition by stating:

"Well, some women are better than men,

O ruler of the people.
Wise and virtuous,
a devoted wife who honors her mother in law.

And when she has a son,
he becomes a hero, O lord of the land.
The son of such a blessed lady

may even rule the realm."

=== Somā Sutta ===
In the Somā Sutta, the nun Somā is addressed by the evil god Māra:

"That state's very challenging;

it's for the sages to attain.
It's not possible for a woman,

with her two-fingered wisdom."

Somā responds to this taunt in verse:

"What difference does womanhood make

when the mind is serene,
and knowledge is present
as you rightly discern the Dhamma.

Surely someone who might think:
'I am woman', or 'I am man',
or 'I am' anything at all,

is fit for Māra to address."

At this response, Māra disappears.

=== Dhanañjānī Sutta ===
According to the Dhanañjānī Sutta, Dhanañjānī, wife of the brahmin Bhāradvāja, had deep faith in the Buddha. She persuaded her husband to speak with the Buddha, who later converted, ordained, and became an arahant.

== Buddhist feminism ==
Buddhist feminism is a movement that seeks to improve the religious, legal, and social status of women within Buddhism. It is an aspect of feminist theology which seeks to advance and understand the equality of men and women morally, socially, spiritually, and in leadership from a Buddhist perspective. The Buddhist feminist Rita Gross describes Buddhist feminism as "the radical practice of the co-humanity of women and men."

== Influential female Buddhist figures ==
=== Pre-sectarian Buddhism ===
- Mahapajapati Gotami, step-mother of the Buddha, first to seek and obtain ordination.
- Yasodharā, Buddha's wife, became a nun and an Arhat.
- Sanghamitta (281–202 BC), daughter of emperor Ashoka, said to have brought Buddhism to Sri Lanka.
- Buddhamitrā was a Buddhist nun living in India during the 1st century who is remembered for images of the Buddha that she erected in three cities near the Ganges river.

=== Theravada ===
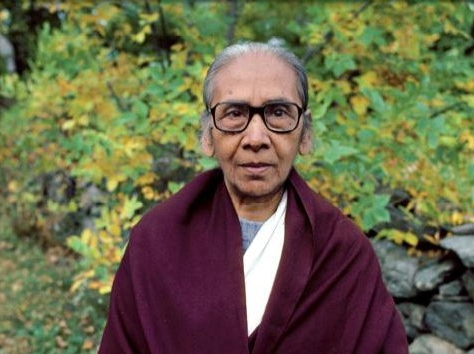
Dipa Ma in Barre, Massachusetts, 1978

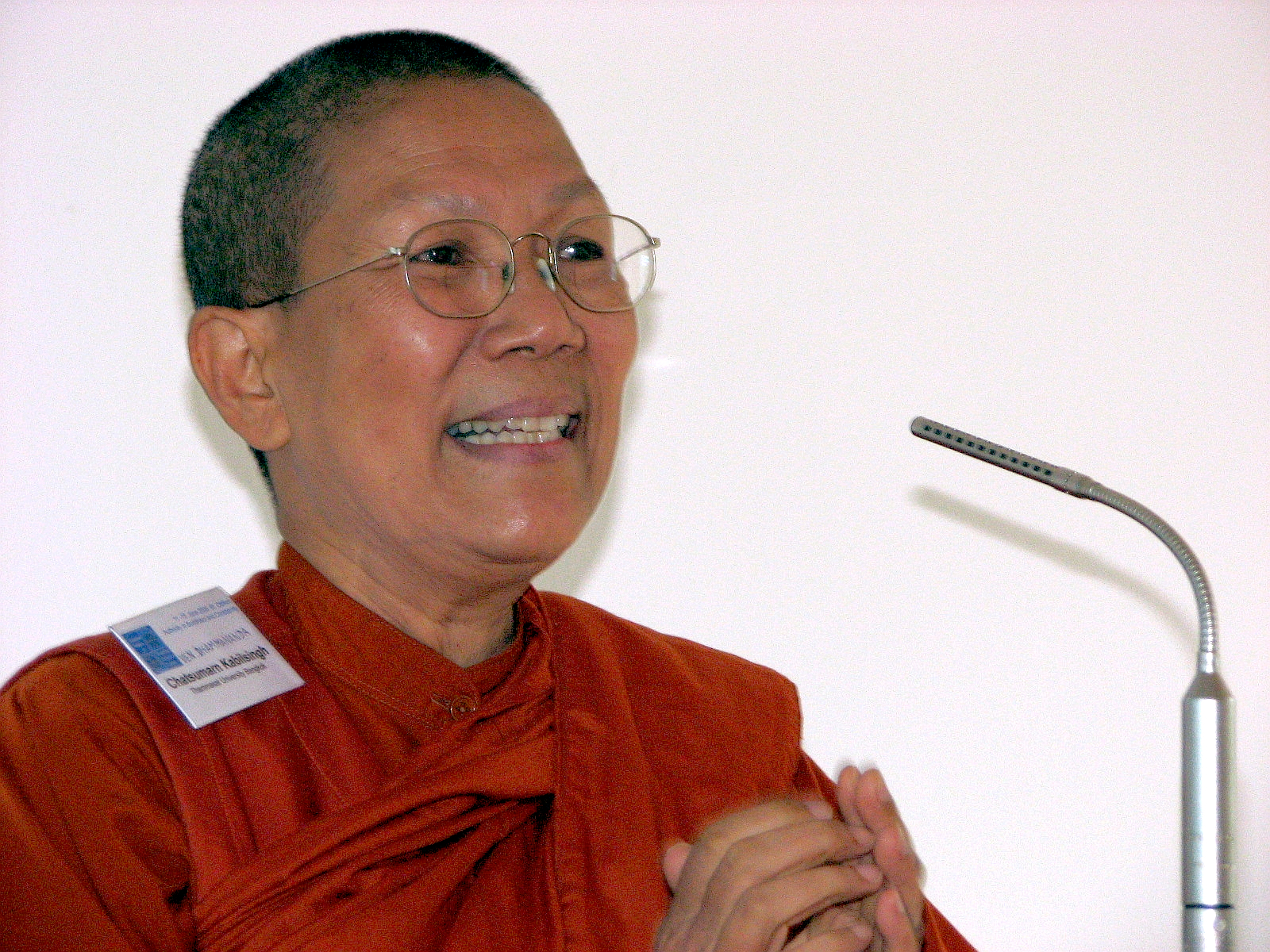
Dhammananda Bhikkhuni

- Dhammananda Bhikkhuni (b. 1944), the first modern Thai woman to receive full ordination as a Theravada bhikkhuni and Abbess of Songdhammakalyani Monastery, the only temple in Thailand where there are bhikkhunis.
- Ayya Khema (1923–1997) was a German American Buddhist teacher and the first Western woman to become a Theravadin Buddhist nun. She was very active in providing opportunities for women to practice Buddhism founding several Buddhist centers around the world and coordinating the first ever Sakyadhita International Association of Buddhist Women. Over two dozen books of her transcribed dhamma talks have been published in several languages, and she also published her autobiography I Give You My Life in 1997.
- Dipa Ma (1911–1989), Indian meditation teacher
- Upasika Kee Nanayon (1901–1978), one of the most popular female meditation teachers in Thailand
- Chandra Khonnokyoong (1909–2000), founder of Wat Phra Dhammakaya
- Sharon Salzberg (b. 1952), teacher of Buddhist meditation practices in the West
- Mya Thwin (1925–2017), meditation teacher
- Ajahn Sundara (b. 1946) and Ajahn Candasiri (b. 1947) are nuns in the Thai Forest Tradition
- Sylvia Boorstein, American author psychoterapist and Buddhist teacher
- Gotamī, Italian bhikkhunī and public figure

=== East Asian traditions ===
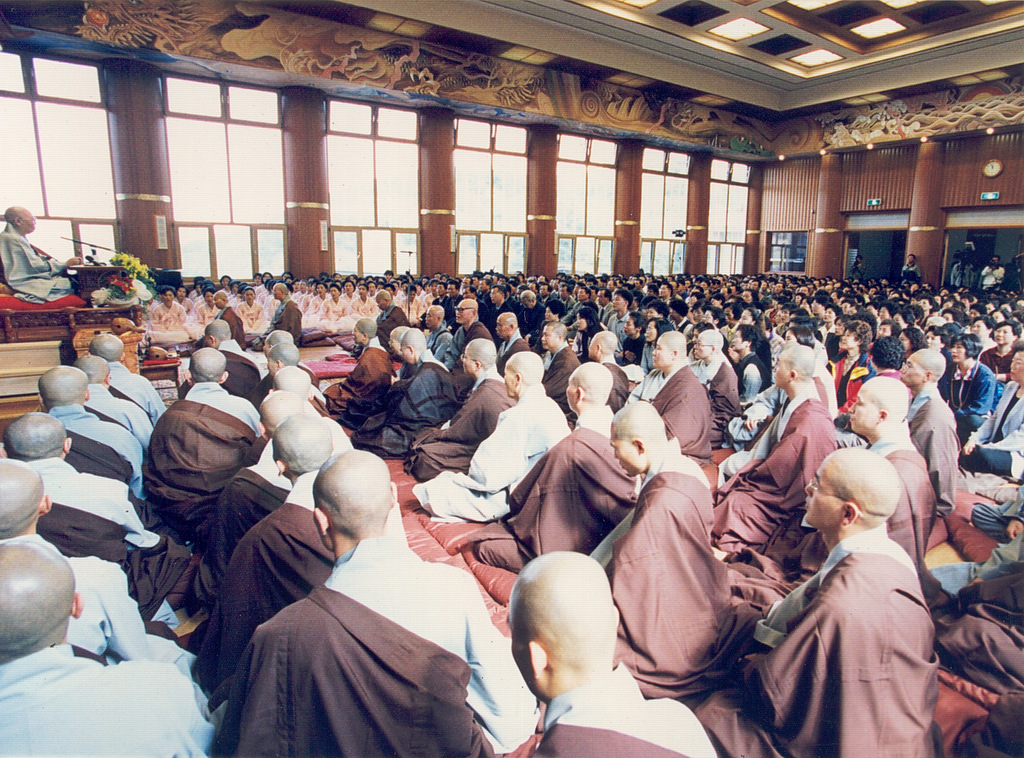
A Dharma talk by Daehaeng Kun Sunim at the Jinju, South Korea, Hanmaum Seon Center

- Joko Beck (1917–2011), founded the Ordinary Mind Zen School.
- Merle Kodo Boyd, first ever African-American woman to have received Dharma transmission in Zen.
- Daehaeng, a popular Korean Buddhist nun who worked for the advancement of Korean nuns and founded the Hanmaum Seon Center.
- Houn Jiyu-Kennett was a British roshi most famous for having been the first female to be sanctioned by the Soto School of Japan to teach in the West. She founded Shasta Abbey in Mt. Shasta, California.
- Chân Không, Vietnamese Buddhist nun, peace activist, who has worked closely with Thích Nhất Hạnh in starting the Plum Village Tradition.
- Enkyo Pat O'Hara, teacher in the Harada-Yasutani lineage. She is abbot and founder of the Village Zendo in New York City. Chairperson of the Board of the National AIDS Interfaith Network.
- Terri Omori, first female president of the Buddhist Churches of America.
- Prajnatara, traditionally said to be a teacher of Bodhidharma.
- Ruth Fuller Sasaki (1892–1967), the first foreigner to be a priest of a Rinzai Zen temple in 1958, and the only westerner, and the only woman, yet to be a priest of a Daitoku-ji.
- Cheng Yen is a Taiwanese Buddhist nun (bhikkhuni) who founded the Buddhist Compassion Relief Tzu Chi Foundation in 1966.
- Wu Zetian (Chinese empress who supported Buddhism in China)
- Zongchi, a disciple of Bodhidharma.

=== Tibetan tradition ===
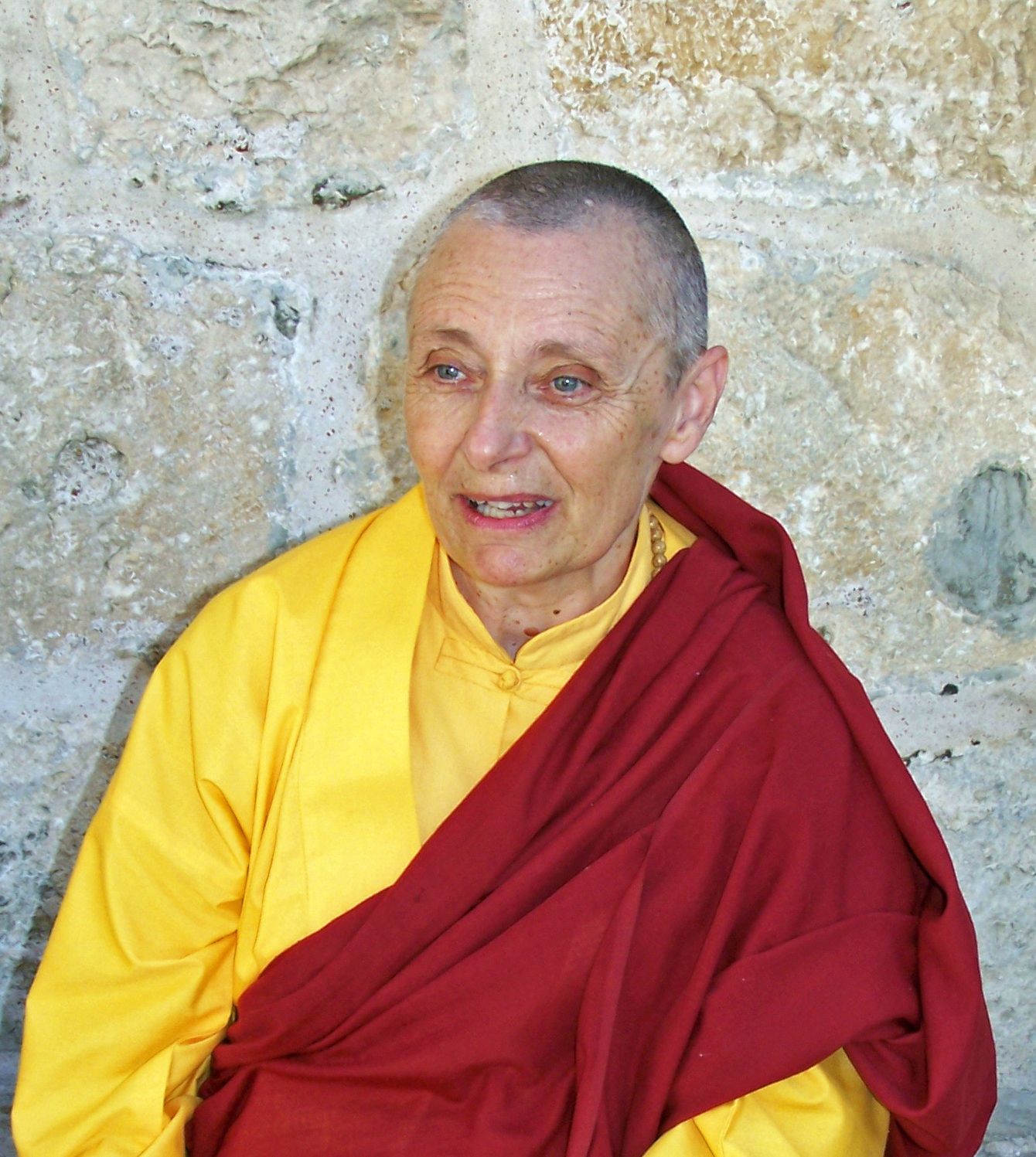
Jetsunma Tenzin Palmo at the Church of the Holy Sepulchre in Jerusalem, September, 2006

- Samding Dorje Phagmo, a lineage of female tulkus
- Sera Khandro Kunzang Dekyong Wangmo (1892–1940), a Terton, considered an emanation of Yeshe Tsogyal
- Ayu Khandro (1839–1953), yogini and terton
- Tare Lhamo (1938–2003), a female Nyingma terton or treasure revealer
- Kushok Chimey Luding (b. 1938), considered an emanation of Vajrayogini
- Khandro Rinpoche (b. 1967), lama, teacher in both the Kagyu and Nyingma schools.
- Karma Lekshe Tsomo (b. 1944) is an American Nun, Professor of Buddhist Studies at University of San Diego, author of many books on Women in Buddhism, founder of Jamyang Foundation and founding member of Sakyadhita International Association of Buddhist Women.
- Jetsunma Tenzin Palmo (b. 1943) is a Tibetan Buddhist nun, author, teacher and founder of the Dongyu Gatsal Ling Nunnery in Himachal Pradesh, India. She spent twelve years living in a remote cave in the Himalayas, three of those years in strict meditation retreat.
- Pema Chödrön (b. 1936) is an ordained Tibetan Buddhist nun, author, and teacher. She has conducted workshops, seminars, and meditation retreats in Europe, Australia, and throughout North America. She is resident and teacher of Gampo Abbey, a monastery in rural Cape Breton, Nova Scotia, Canada.
- Thubten Chodron (b. 1950) is an American Tibetan Buddhist nun and a central figure in reinstating the Tibetan Bhikshuni (Gelongma) ordination of women. She is a student of XIVth Dalai Lama, Tsenzhap Serkong Rinpoche, Thubten Zopa Rinpoche and other Tibetan masters.
- Robina Courtin (b. 1944) is an Australian Buddhist nun in the Tibetan Buddhist Gelugpa tradition and lineage of Lama Thubten Yeshe and Lama Zopa Rinpoche. In 1996 she founded Liberation Prison Project, which she ran until 2009.
- Ani Choying Drolma (b. 1971) is a Nepalese Buddhist nun and musician from the Nagi Gompa nunnery in Nepal. She is known in Nepal and throughout the world for bringing many Tibetan Buddhist chants and feast songs to mainstream audiences. She has been recently appointed as the UNICEF Goodwill Ambassador to Nepal.
- Yeshe Khadro (b. 1950), Australian ordained Buddhist nun who has worked in management and teaching roles for many FPMT centres around the world. For the past 15 years she has been the director of Karuna Hospice in Brisbane, Australia. In 2012, Yeshe Khadro was named a Paul Harris Fellow by Rotary International "in appreciation of the furtherance of better understanding and friendly relations among peoples of the world".
- Tsultrim Allione (b. 1947), American author and teacher who has studied in the Karma Kagyu lineage
- Jetsunma Ahkon Lhamo (b. 1949), tulku within the Palyul lineage of the Nyingma tradition
- Sarah Harding (lama), teacher in the Shangpa Kagyu tradition
- Judith Simmer-Brown, Distinguished Professor of Contemplative and Religious Studies Emerita in Naropa University, acharya in the Shambhala Buddhist tradition
- Jan Willis (b. 1948), Professor of Religion at Wesleyan University
- Vicki Mackenzie (b. 1947), English author and journalist
- Lama Shenpen Hookham (b. 1946), is a British teacher and scholar in the Karma Kagyu/Nyingma traditions of Tibetan Buddhism. Lama Shenpen was ordained as a nun in India by the 16th Karmapa in the early 1970s who asked her to return to the West to teach. She became a translator for the first wave of Tibetan masters to Europe in the 1970s and 1980s, and her personal teachers include Kalu Rinpoche, Karma Trinley Rinpoche, Bokar Rinpoche, Gendun Rinpoche, Chogyam Trungpa Rinpoche and Khenpo Tsultrim Gyamtso Rinpoche who became her main teacher and encouraged her to teach and transmit Mahamudra. On Khenpo Tsultrim Gyamtso Rinpoche's advice she gave up her nun's vows and went to Oxford University where she produced a seminal study of the profound Buddha Nature doctrines [according to the Shentong interpretation of the Ratnagotravibhaga], published as The Buddha Within (Suny Press), and gained a doctorate. Lama Shenpen is the spiritual director of the Awakened Heart Sangha and is based in semi-retreat in North-west Wales. In 2020 her life story was published as 'Keeping the Dalai Lama Waiting & Other Stories: An English Woman's Journey to Becoming a Buddhist Lama' which includes many personal stories of her time in India and Europe learning from and translating for some of the most eminent Tibetan masters.

=== Celebrities ===
- Belinda Carlisle
- Cheryl Boone Isaacs
- Sabina Guzzanti
- k.d. lang
- Tina Turner

== See also ==
- Jetsunma, Tibetan title meaning "venerable" or "reverend"
- Women in Christianity
- Women in Daoism
- Women in Islam
- Women in Hinduism
- Women in Judaism
- Women in Sikhism
- International Congress on Buddhist Women's Role in the Sangha
- Ordination of women in Buddhism
- Criticism of Buddhism#Women in Buddhism

== Bibliography ==
- Rao, Vinay Kumar (2012). Women in Buddhist Art. New Delhi: Agam Kala Prakashan. ISBN 9788173201264.
- Law, Bimala Churn (1927). Women in Buddhist Literature, Ceylon: Bastian & Co.
- Diana Y. Paul; Frances Wilson (1985). Women in Buddhism: Images of the Feminine in Mahāyāna Tradition. Oakland, California: University of California Press. ISBN 9780520054288.
- Bartholomeusz, Tessa J. (1994). Women under the Bō tree : Buddhist nuns in Sri Lanka (1. publ., reprinted ed.). Cambridge: Cambridge University Press. ISBN 9780521461290.
- Karma Lekshe Tsomo (2014). Eminent Buddhist Women. Albany, New York: State University of New York Press. ISBN 9781438451305.
- Ellison Banks Findly (2000). Women's Buddhism, Buddhism's Women: Tradition, Revision, Renewal. Boston: Wisdom Publications. ISBN 9780861711659.
- Karma Lekshe Tsomo (1999). Buddhist Women Across Cultures. Albany, New York: State University of New York Press. ISBN 9780791441381.
- Paula Kane Robinson Arai (1999). Women Living Zen : Japanese Soto Buddhist Nuns. Oxford: Oxford University Press. ISBN 9780195344158.
- Campbell, June (2003). Gender, Identity, and Tibetan Buddhism. Delhi: Motilal Banarsidass. ISBN 9788120817821.
