= Jetsun =

Jetsun (Tibetan: རྗེ་བཙུན།, Wylie: rje btsun) or Jetsunma (Tibetan: རྗེ་བཙུན་མ།, Wylie: rje btsun ma; the "ma" suffix is feminine) is a Tibetan title meaning "venerable" or "reverend." It is a specific term applied to revered teachers and practitioners of Vajrayana Buddhism. The title is applied to adepts and learned lamas such as Jetsun Milarepa. "Je" (Wylie transliteration: rJe) refers to those of high rank, including kings and nobles; "tsun" (Wylie transliteration: bTsun) refers to 1) those of noble rank, 2) those who are monastics, or 3) those who combine the three characteristics of being learned, noble, and good. The two together emphasize the honorific while "tsun" applies the term specifically to ecclesiastics.

In terms of Jetsunmas, the title could refer to:

- Jetsunma Chime Tenpai Nyima (rje btsun ma 'chi med bstan pa'i nyi ma) (b. 1756)
- Jetsunma Dechen Wangmo
- Jetsun Dolma
- Jetsunma Ahkon Lhamo
- Jétsunma Khandro Yeshé Réma
- Jetsunma Kushok Chimey Luding, sister of Sakya Trizin
- Jetsunma Niguma
- Jetsun Milarepa
- Jetsunma Mingyur Paldron, Minling Jetsunma Mingyur Peldron (smin gling rje btsun mi 'gyur dpal sgron, (1699–1769), daughter of Terton Terdak Lingpa
- Jetsunma Pema Trinle
- Jetsunma Shukseb, Shukseb Jetsun Choying Zangmo (shug gseb rje btsun chos dbyings bzang mo, (1865–1951)
- Jetsunma Tamdrin Wangmo Kelzang Chokyi Nyima (rje btsun ma grub pa'i rta mgrin dbang mo skal bzang chos kyi nyi ma) (1836–1896)
- Jetsunma Tenzin Palmo, a well-known western yogini
- Jetsunma Tsewang Lhamo (d. 1812)
- Jetsun Pema, Queen consort of Bhutan
- Jetsun Pema, activist
- Mindrolling Jetsün Khandro Rinpoche
