= Gotami Theri =

Italian Theravāda Buddhist nun

Venerable Gotami Theri
- ගෝතමී තෙරණිය
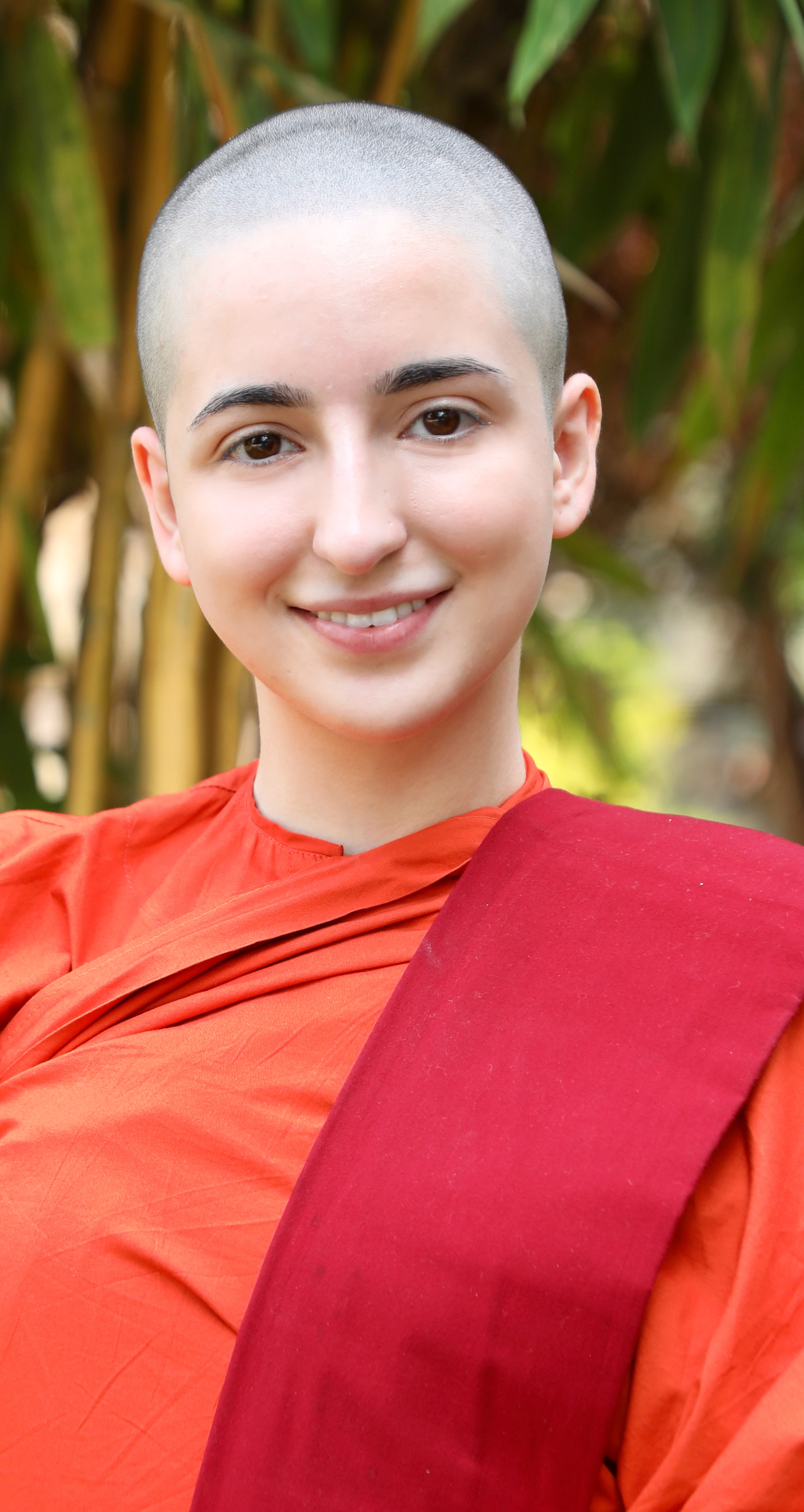
- Venerable Gotami during a Dhamma teaching session in 2026

Personal life
- Born: Martina Catania; January 8, 1999 (age 27) Catania, Sicily, Italy
- Notable work: Gotamī: A Life Rewritten by the Dhamma (2026)
- Education: University of Naples "L'Orientale"
- Known for: Western Theravāda monasticism; women in Buddhism advocacy
- Occupation: Buddhist nun
- Website: Official website

Religious life
- Religion: Buddhism
- School: Theravāda
- Dharma name: Gotamī
- Monastic name: Dhammabhanaka
- Ordination: 9 December 2022

Senior posting
- Teacher: Ashin Nayaka
- Based in: Colombo, Sri Lanka

Venerable Gotami (born Martina Catania; 8 January 1999) is an Italian Theravāda Buddhist nun, author, and meditation teacher. She was ordained as a novice nun in 2022 at the age of 23 under the guidance of Ashin Nayaka. She later moved to Sri Lanka, where she teaches the Dhamma in English and Sinhala.

== Biography ==
=== Early life and education ===
Gotami was born as Martina Catania on 8 January 1999 in Catania, Sicily, Italy. She was raised in a working-class family in a Catholic household and received traditional religious education during childhood. During her school years she developed an interest in reading, languages, and philosophical questions concerning suffering and ethics.

She attended the Giusippina Turrisi Colonna high school in Catania, where she specialized in foreign languages. During this period she studied Chinese and English and began memorising verses in Pali, the liturgical language of Theravada Buddhism. Language study later became central to her work as a private tutor and translator for Italian, Chinese, and English.

She later moved to Naples and earned a Bachelor of Arts degree in Languages and Cultures of Asia and Africa from the University of Naples "L'Orientale". Her university studies further developed her interest in philosophy, ethics, and contemplative spirituality.

=== Encounter with Buddhism ===
She first became acquainted with Buddhism as a teenager through a teacher, who mentioned a Sri Lankan Buddhist temple in Catania during a class discussion. She subsequently visited the temple and later participated in meditation sessions and Vesak celebrations. During her school she developed a strong interest in languages and literature. She studied Chinese and English and memorised Pali verses used in Buddhist liturgy. After moving to Naples for university studies, she began exploring Buddhist practice more openly.

=== Conversion to Buddhism and monastic training ===
Gotami’s interest in Buddhist teachings developed gradually through reading introductory texts and listening to online teachings by Theravāda monks. She moved from informal meditation practice to studying key teachings such as the Four Noble Truths and the Noble Eightfold Path. Her transition from Catholicism to Buddhism developed gradually over time. During her university years, she began sharing reflections on the Dhamma through online platforms and informal talks, including discussions in Chinese and English.

On 8 May 2022, Gotami ordained as a temporary thilashin in Myanmar at the Maggaphala Meditation Center in Hlegu for one month. She trained under Ashin Nyanadeepa and was given the name Venerable Saddhamuni (“sage of true faith”). During this time, she practiced meditation and followed monastic discipline. After this, she returned to Italy and continued her meditation practice. On 9 December 2022, at age 23, Gotami ordained as a Theravāda novice nun (Sayalay) under Ashin Nayaka. She undertook the Ten Precepts and began formal training according to the Vinaya. She later continued her monastic path under Ashin Nayaka and resumed her monastic life at the Maharakkhita Buddhist Temple in Texas. Her daily routine includes chanting, meditation, study, and participation in temple life.

== Teachings and outreach ==
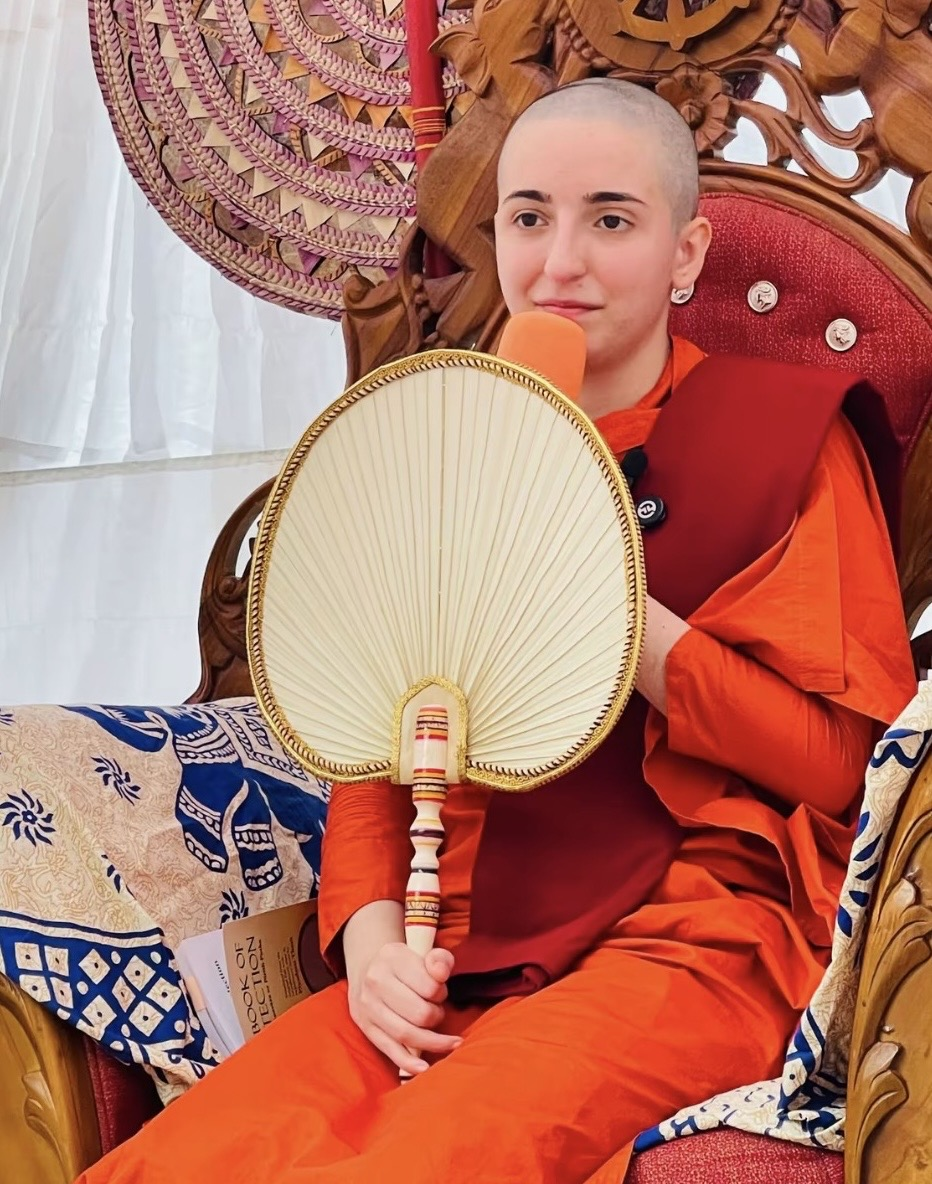
Venerable Gotami during dhamma session in 2026

Gotami teaches meditation and foundational principles of Theravāda Buddhism, emphasizing their application in daily life and the role of renunciation in contemporary society.

Her public talks and educational content address topics such as ethical conduct (sīla), mental discipline (samādhi), and wisdom (paññā), as well as themes including desire, attachment, and the role of women in Buddhism.

She delivers Dhamma talks and instructional material in multiple languages, including Sinhala, English, Italian, and Chinese. Her teachings are shared through in-person events, interviews, and digital platforms.

During her residence at Buddhist institutions, she has also participated in community activities and administrative responsibilities.

== Present day ==
As of 2024, Gotami lived at the Maharakkhita Buddhist Temple in Lancaster, Dallas County, Texas for two years, where she continued her monastic training under Ashin Nayaka. She also worked as the temple’s secretary and helped with daily activities and community service work. The temple serves both immigrant and Western practitioners within the Theravāda tradition. During this period, she took part in daily chanting, meditation, scriptural study, and community activities. She also spoke to wider audiences through interviews and online platforms about meditation, renunciation, and the role of women in Buddhism. Following her residence in the United States, Gotami relocated to Sri Lanka, where she is currently based in Colombo. In Sri Lanka, she has delivered Dhamma talks in English and Sinhala.

In May 2025, she delivered her first televised sermon on the program Sati on TV Derana. She subsequently continued preaching and appearing in Dhamma programs on major Sri Lankan television channels, including Sirasa TV, Swarnavahini, and ITN. Her autobiography Gotamī: A Life Rewritten by the Dhamma (2026) has gained attention in Buddhist circles. It has been discussed as an autobiographical account of her monastic life, cultural background, and the role of women in Theravāda Buddhism. Her second book, The First Nun To Open the Path: The Revolutionary Awakening of Mahapajapati Gotami, further expands on these themes by examining the historical and spiritual legacy of Mahāpajāpatī Gotamī, the founder of the Buddhist order of nuns (Bhikkhunī Saṅgha). The work explores the institutional challenges faced by early female monastics and analyzes the social implications of women's ordination in ancient and contemporary Theravāda traditions.

Both works have been acquired by the SOAS Library at the School of Oriental and African Studies, University of London, where they are included in the collection dedicated to Asian religions and Buddhist studies.

== Publication ==
- Gotamī: A Life Rewritten by the Dhamma. Sri Lanka: Sadeepa Publisher. 2026. ISBN 978-624-200-131-9.
- The First Nun To Open The Path: The Revolutionary Awakening of Mahāpājapatī Gotamī. Self Published. 2026. ASIN B0HCW5HRDY.

== See also ==
- Women in Buddhism
- Bhikkhunī
- Buddhist feminism
- Theravāda
- Buddhism in Sri Lanka
- Buddhism in Italy
