= Ajahn Sundara =

Buddhist monastic

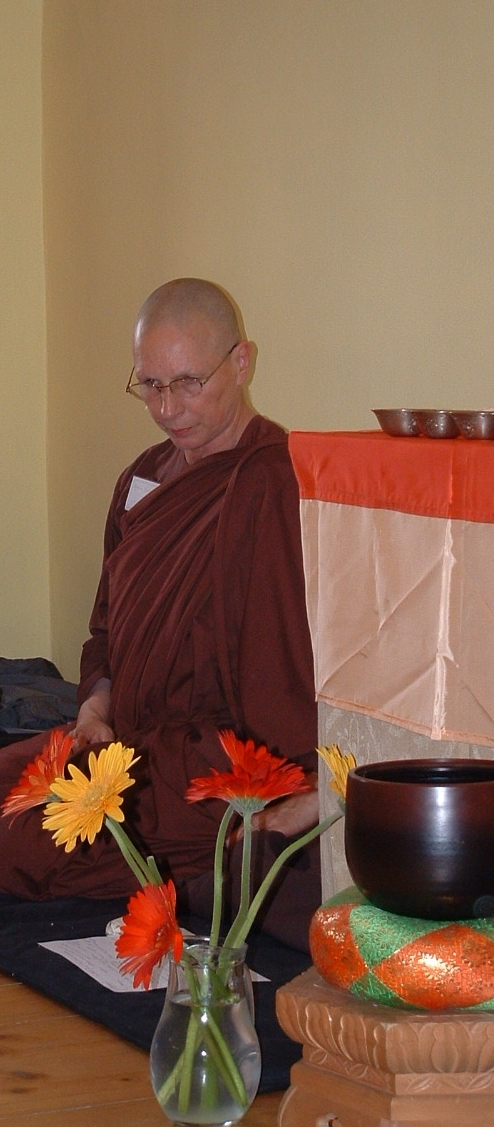

Personal life
- Born: 1946 (age 79–80) France
- Website: amaravati.org

Religious life
- Religion: Buddhism
- Order: Sīladhārā
- School: Theravāda
- Lineage: Forest Tradition of Ajahn Chah
- Ordination: 1983 (43 years ago)

Senior posting
- Teacher: Ajahn Sumedho
- Based in: Amaravati Buddhist Monastery

Ajahn Sundara (born 1946) is a French-born Buddhist sīladhārā in the tradition established by Ajahn Sumedho.

== Life ==
She studied contemporary dance and worked as a dancer and dance teacher until her early thirties when she had the opportunity to meet Ajahn Sumedho in England and to attend one of his Dhamma talks and then a retreat. She was one of the first four women ordained by Ajahn Sumedho in 1979 as an anagārikā (an eight-precept novice) and in 1983 as a ten-precept sīladhārā. After living at Chithurst Buddhist Monastery in England, Ajahn Sundara moved in 1984 to Amaravati Buddhist Monastery and was instrumental in founding the nuns' community there. She went to Thailand in the mid-1990s, where she spent more than two years, primarily on retreat at forest monasteries. She has been teaching and leading retreats in Europe and North America for many years. She currently resides at Amaravati Buddhist Monastery, whose history and relevance to women in Buddhism she has chronicled in the book chapter "The Theravada Sangha Goes West: The Story of Amaravati".

== Publications ==
- Gates, Barbara; Gates, Wes, eds. (2008), "On Fearlessness and Fear: a conversation with Tenzin Palmo, Ajahn Sundara, Ajahn Jitindriya and Yvonne Rand" (Paperback), 25 Years of Dharma, Drama, and Uncommon Insight, Boston: Wisdom Publications, pp. 192–198, ISBN 978-0861715510
- Sundara, Ajahn; Candasiri, Ajahn (2011), Friends on the Path, Amaravati Publications, ISBN 978-1-870205-24-5
- Sundara, Ajahn; Candasiri, Ajahn; Metta, Ajahn (2013), The Body, Amaravati Buddhist Monastery, ISBN 978-1-870205-72-6
- Sundara, Ajahn (2014), Walking the World
- Sundara, Ajahn (2016), Seeds of Dhamma, Amaravati Publications, pp. 1–94, ISBN 978-1-78432-046-1
- Sundara, Ajahn (2017), Paccuppanna: The Present Moment, Amaravati Publications, pp. 1–78, ISBN 978-1-78432-079-9

== See also ==
- Thai Forest Tradition
- Ajahn Chah
- Ajahn Sumedho
- Ajahn Candasiri
- Chithurst Buddhist Monastery
- Amaravati Buddhist Monastery
