= Jetsun Sherab Sengge =

Tibetan monk (1382/1383 – 1445)

Jetsün Sherab Sengge
- Born: 1382 or 1383
- Died: 1445; Ganden Monastery
- Other names: rje btsun shes rab seng ge
- Known for: Founder of Lower Tantra College/Faculty (Gyüme) in 1433

Jetsün Sherab Sengge (1382 or 1383 – 1445) Wylie: rje btsun shes rab seng ge also known as Je Sherab Sengge, Xirao Sengge, Jizun Xirao Sengge or Jiezun Xirao Sengge was a cleric of the Gelug school of Tibetan Buddhism. In 1433 he founded the Lower Tantra College or the Lower Tantric Faculty (Gyüme Dratshang) in Lhasa.

== See also ==
- Jetsun
