= Pema Trinle =

Jetsun Pema Trinle (1874-1950) was a Tibetan Buddhist teacher, and was one of only a few women authorized to teach the general and esoteric presentation of the Path and Result in the Sakya tradition, known as Lamdre Tsokshe and Lobshe respectively. As a child she received teachings from her paternal great-aunt Jetsunma Tamdrin Wangmo, her elder brother, her father Kunga Nyingpo Sampel Norbu, and the abbot of Ngor, Ngawang Lodro Nyingpo. She rarely gave public teachings. She did tour eastern Tibet to give and receive teachings, and her main teacher there was Tenpai Wangchuk, who himself was a disciple of her great-aunt Tamdrin Wangmo. She also received Lamdre teachings from Jamyang Loter Wangpo, and gave teachings to the 3rd Dezhung Rinpoche.

She was known as a very famous nun who could predict anyone's time of death, and as a powerful medium to the Bamo deities, who were associated with the Khon family (her family).

There is a tradition that when she was giving initiations in one of the Sakya monasteries, other monasteries criticized having a woman do this, and they sent some monastic police to beat her; however, she caused an initiation vase to levitate in front of her while she adjusted her robes, and the police prostrated, received blessings from her and left.

She was the sister of Dragshul Trinle.
