= Chime Tenpai Nyima =

Tibetan Buddhist master

Jetsunma Chime Tenpai Nyima (born 1756) was a Tibetan Buddhist master, the only female master of the Sakya Vajrayoginī lineage. She is also considered a great siddha and an emanation of Vajrayoginī.

== Biography ==
She was born in Tibet and originally had the name Chime Butri. She was part of the prominent Sakya Khon family, which established itself by the 11th century in Sakya, Tibet. She studied with her uncle Kunga Lodro, who had had a vision prophesying, among other things, that she would be one of the closest disciples who would carry on his teachings. He transmitted to her the core Sakya Lamdre and the Vajrayogini teachings, among others. In 1782, she took novice vows from the twenty-fifth abbot of the Sakya Lhakhang Chenmo, Jampa Chokyi Tashi, who gave her the ordination name by which she has come to be known, Chime Tenpai Nyima.

When Kunga Lodro died in 1783, she recited the Vajrayoginī prayers and accompanying offerings for his funeral rites.

Her main disciple was Derge Drubpon Ngawang Rinchen. According to tradition, she gave him the Vajrayoginī teachings late in her life, when she could no longer see well, but her vision improved as she gave the teachings, and she told him, “Seeing a Lama like you in Tibet restored my eyesight.” Again according to tradition, when she gave him the Vajrayoginī blessing, during the inner blessing ritual the ambrosia in the cup started to boil spontaneously, and as he drank it, his understanding of emptiness expanded.

She was also the teacher of four Sakya Tridzin (the heads of the tradition), as well as their brothers and children, abbots of Ngor Monastery, and many other tulkus and important teachers in the Sakya tradition. She was one of few women who had the authority to teach both Lamdre Tsokshe and Lobshe.

It is unknown exactly when she died, but it is known she lived a long life, and she was called Rikmo Dung, or Old Noble Woman of the Rigdzin Palace. After she died, a memorial statue of Vajrayoginī with a silver crown and ornaments inlaid with precious gems was made to contain her relics, which was installed in the Lhakhang Chenmo at Sakya.
