= Venerable Wuling =

American Chinese Buddhist nun (born 1946)

Wuling
- 悟琳法师
- Title: Venerable

Personal life
- Born: 1946 (age 79–80) New York, United States

Religious life
- Religion: Buddhism
- School: Pure Land Buddhism
- Lineage: Chin Kung

Wuling (Chinese: 悟琳法师; pinyin: Shì Wùlíng; born 1946) is an American Buddhist nun in the Pure Land tradition of Mahayana Buddhism. A disciple of Venerable Master Chin Kung, she is known for her involvement in Buddhist education, translation work, and the promotion of Pure Land teachings in English-speaking communities.

== Early life and ordination ==
Wuling was born in 1946 in New York, United States. She later developed an interest in Buddhist teachings and traveled to Taiwan, where she ordained as a Buddhist nun in the Chinese Mahayana tradition. After ordination, she continued her monastic training and later returned to the United States, residing for a period in Texas while participating in Buddhist teaching and community activities.

== Teaching and service ==
Between 1998 and 2001, Wuling delivered lectures and participated in Buddhist programs in Malaysia and Singapore, teaching Pure Land practice and introductory Buddhist principles for lay audiences.

She became involved in Buddhist publishing and translation projects, text and lectures to english from the Pure Land tradition, serving as the head of the Silent Voices Translation Team, later known to become the Pure Land Translation Team.

In 2005, she was appointed vice president of the Pure Land Learning College Association. She later took up residence at its headquarters in Toowoomba, Australia, where she has continued teaching, writing, and supporting Buddhist educational initiatives.

== Teachings and approach ==
Wuling’s teachings emphasize the practical application of Pure Land principles in everyday life. Her talks and writings often focus on ethical conduct, mindfulness in daily activities, gratitude, and compassion. She encourages the recitation of the name of Amitābha Buddha as a central practice and highlights the importance of sincerity, humility, and moral discipline in spiritual cultivation.

In addition to devotional practices, she promotes the study of classical Mahayana texts and the integration of Buddhist values into family and community life. Her approach reflects the educational vision of her teacher, Venerable Master Chin Kung, particularly the use of modern media and translation work to make Buddhist teachings accessible to English-speaking audiences.

== Writings and publications ==
Wuling has authored, edited, and contributed to a number of English-language works on Pure Land Buddhism and Buddhist ethical practice. Her publications include:

- In One Lifetime: Pure Land Buddhism
- Everything We Do Matters
- Pure Mind, Compassionate Heart
- Lundeeria: The Tale of a Journey to Another Land, Courage, and Compassion
- Going Home to the Pure Land (editor and contributor)
- How Will I Behave Today and the Rest of My Life
- Awaken to the Buddha Within (2006)
- Path to Peace (2005)
- Heart of a Buddha (editor and contributor)

== See also ==
- Women in Buddhism
- Bhikkhunī
- Chinese Buddhism
- Pure Land Buddhism
