= Mingyur Paldron =

Jetsunma Mingyur Paldron, or Mingyur Peldrön (Tibetan: མི་འགྱྱུར་དཔལ་སྒྒྲྲོན་ mi 'gyur dpal sgron, 1699–1769) was a Tibetan Buddhist lama in the Kagyu and Nyingma traditions. She was the daughter of Chögyal Terdag Lingpa (Tibetan: ཆོས་རྒྒྱྱལ་གཏེར་བདག་གླླིང་པ་ chos rgyal gter bdag gling pa), the founder of Mindrolling Monastery. She was a disciple of Gyurme Tekchok Tendzin. She received the entire transmissions of Thug Je Chenpo De Sheg Kun Du from Lochen Dharmashri and mastered the Tsa-lung and Thigle practices at the age of fourteen. In 1717, when the Mongols invaded Tibet, she escaped to Sikkim where she taught the dharma for two years and founded the Pema Yangtse monastery. After the Mongol invasion, she returned to the Tibetan monastery Mindrolling, which had been destroyed, and rebuilt it with her younger brother. She also gave empowerments, oral transmissions, and explanations of the collected works of Chögyal Terdag Lingpa and the Nyingthig Yabzhi to over 270 disciples, as well as establishing Samten Tse nunnery near Mindrolling .

An extensive hagiography of 200 folios, written by her disciple Gyurmé Ösel ('gyur med 'od gsal, b. 1715), was completed thirteen years after her death. Alison Melnick Dyer has published articles about Mingyur Paldron, and is currently writing a book about her life and influence.
