= Buddhamitra =

Buddhamitrā

Personal life
- Born: ca. 60 Mathurā
- Occupation: bhikkhunī

Religious life
- Religion: Buddhism
- School: Sarvāstivāda

Senior posting
- Teacher: Bala

Buddhamitrā (born c. 60) was a Buddhist nun from India during the Kushan Empire. She is remembered because of dated inscriptions on images of bodhisattvas and the Buddha that she erected in three cities near the Ganges river. They mark her success in attracting money and patronage to the Sarvāstivāda, the sect of Buddhism to which she belonged.

== Life and work ==
Buddhamitrā was born around 60 in Mathurā. Her parents were wealthy Buddhists. She entered into the sangha and became a Buddhist nun. Her teacher was a monk named Bala, who belonged to the Sarvāstivāda, an early school of Buddhism. Both teacher and student were educated in the entire threefold knowledge of Buddhism (the Tripiṭaka) and were noted for their efforts.

Accompanied at first by a monk named Pushyavuddhi, beginning in about 117, Buddhamitrā and Bala built monuments at Śrāvastī and at Sārnāth. They had the help of two of the region's satraps or governors, Vanaspara and Kharapallāna, the "great satrap". For the next six years, or until about 123, Buddhamitrā then went to Kosam, where she built several monuments.

For example, one of the images at Kosam is a standing stone bodhisattva which today can be seen in the Allahabad Museum. Satya Shrava gives a translation of the inscription, originally written in Brāhmī characters in a mixture of the Sanskrit and Prākrit. It reads, "In the year 2 of mahārāja Kanishka, in the 2nd month of hemanta, i.e., the winter season, on the 8th day, the image of Bodhisattva is set up by the nun Buddhamitrā, well versed in the Tripitaka, at the promenade of the Lord Buddha."

Buddhamitrā and Bala were not interested in only converting others to their religion. To quote A Rough Guide to Kushan History, "[P]atronage, not conversion was the goal of Buddhamitra." She sought, successfully, money from wealthy and powerful people to promote Buddhism, specifically for followers of the Sarvāstivāda school. The prestige of each patron enhanced the legitimacy of Sarvāstivāda. Her desire was to reach the leaders of the Kushan Empire.

Buddhamitrā lived at the time of the Fourth Buddhist council and it is likely that given her political connections and learning that she was involved. She is a remarkable figure because despite living in a patriarchal society she has left a mark in history where many male kings have been entirely forgotten.

Her niece, who was a nun named Dhanavati (or Dhanadevī), in 148 built a memorial in honor of Buddhamitrā in the city of her birth. Shrava gives a translation of the inscription:

In the year 33 of mahārāja, devaputra Huvishka, in the 8th day of the 1st grīshma or summer [month], a Bodhisattva was set up at [Ma]dh[u]ravaṇaka or Mathurā by the nun Dhanavatī, the sister's daughter of the nun Buddhamitrā, who knows the Tripitaka, a female pupil of the monk Bala, who knows the Tripitaka, together with her mother and father ......

== Record ==
The female gender of someone named Buddhamitrā has been known since at least the 1960s or 1970s. A Rough Guide to Kushan History says, "The evidence for Buddhamitra comes completely from inscriptions." Just as other scholars have, Theo Damsteegt catalogs these inscriptions, in his case, in his 1978 doctoral dissertation, Epigraphical Hybrid Sanskrit, which identifies Buddhamitrā as a nun. Including all of the known works by and about Buddhamitrā, in 1993, Satya Shrava published a book of the inscriptions of the Kushan Empire rulers of India that have dates, along with a photograph of each one. Peter Skilling refers to this historical record and to a female named Buddhamitrā in 2001, in "Nuns, Laywomen, Donors, Goddesses: Female Roles in Early Indian Buddhism". Thea Mohr and Jampa Tsoedren give the female gender of someone named Buddhamitrā in a footnote in their book Dignity & Discipline: Reviving Full Ordination for Buddhist Nuns (2010), which identifies Buddhamitrā as a nun, one who had committed the entire Tripitaka to memory.
