= Rita Gross =

American Buddhist feminist scholar

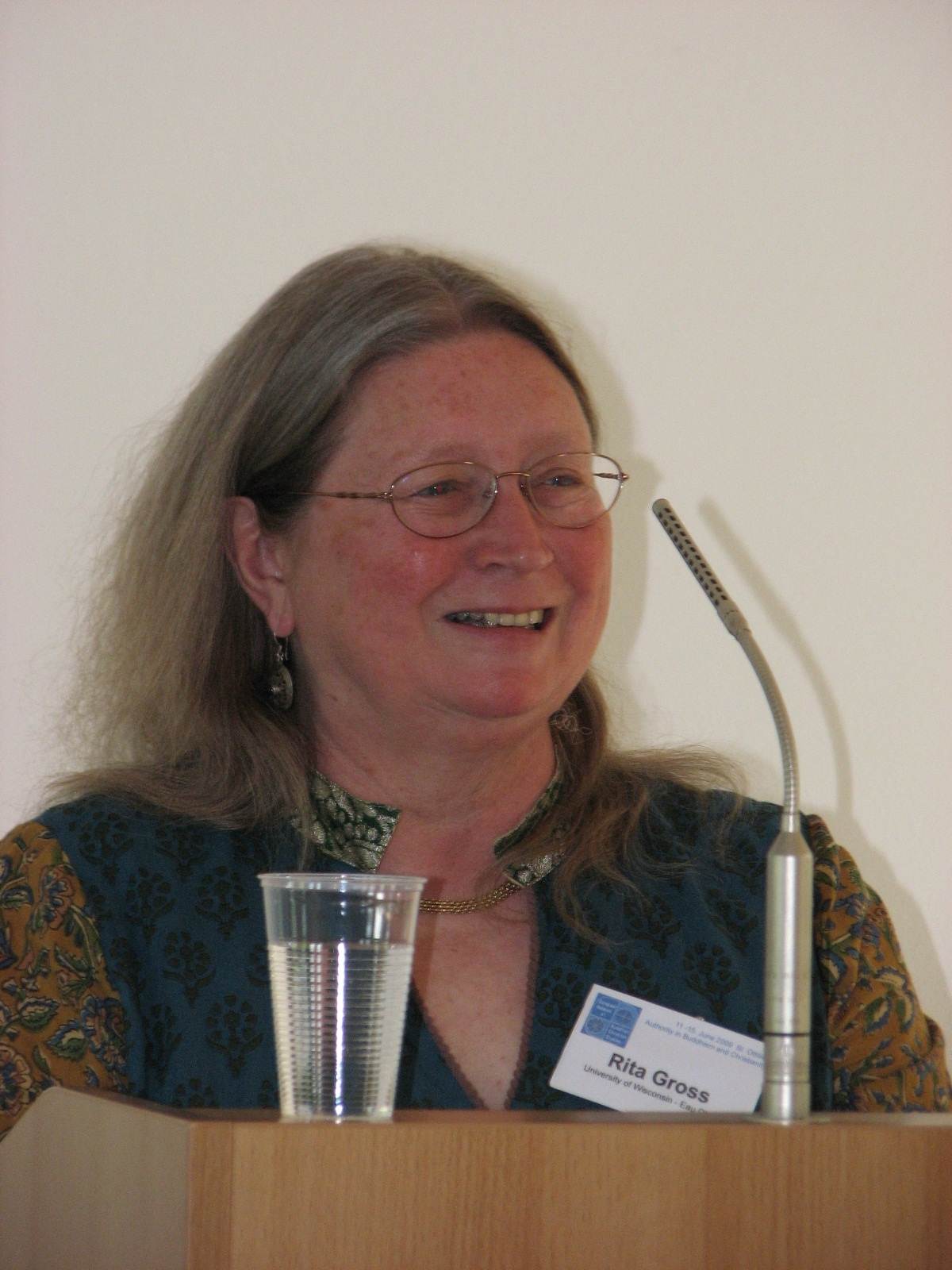
- Speaking at an international conference in Germany
- Born: July 6, 1943
- Died: November 11, 2015 (aged 72); Eau Claire, Wisconsin, U.S.
- Education: University of Chicago (PhD)
- Writing career
- Subject: Theology

Rita M. Gross (July 6, 1943 – November 11, 2015) was an American Buddhist feminist scholar of religions and author. Before retiring, she was Professor of Comparative Studies in Religion at the University of Wisconsin–Eau Claire.

In 1974 Gross was named the head of Women and Religion, a newly created section of the American Academy of Religion. She earned her PhD in 1975 from the University of Chicago in History of Religions, with the dissertation "Exclusion and Participation: The Role of Women in Aboriginal Australian Religion." This was the first dissertation ever on women's studies in religion. In 1976 she published the article "Female God Language in a Jewish Context" (Davka Magazine 17), which Jewish scholar and feminist Judith Plaskow considers "probably the first article to deal theoretically with the issue of female God-language in a Jewish context". Gross was herself born Lutheran before converting to Judaism in her twenties.

In 1977 Gross took refuge with Chögyam Trungpa Rinpoche, becoming a Tibetan Buddhist. In 2005 she was made a lopön (Tibetan (Wylie): slob dpon; Sanskrit (IAST): ācārya, "senior teacher") by Jetsün Khandro Rinpoche, and taught at Jetsun Khandro Rinpoche's Lotus Garden Center, located in the United States.

Gross grew up on a dairy farm in the Rhinelander, Wisconsin area. Gross died, of a stroke, on November 11, 2015, at her home in Eau Claire, Wisconsin.

== Books written by Gross ==
- Buddhism beyond Gender: Liberation from Attachment to Identity, Boulder, CO: Shambhala Publications, 2018.
- Religious Diversity: What's the Problem? Buddhist Advice for Flourishing with Religious Diversity, Eugene, OR: Cascade Books, 2014.
- A Garland of Feminist Reflections: Forty Years of Religious Reflection, Berkeley, CA: University of California Press, 2009.
- Religious Feminism and the Future of the Planet: A Buddhist-Christian-Feminist Conversation (with Rosemary Radford Ruether), New York: Continuum, 2001.
- Soaring and Settling: Buddhist Perspectives on Contemporary Social and Religious Issues, New York: Continuum, 1998.
- Feminism and Religion: An Introduction; Boston: Beacon Press, 1996; Korean translation, 1999; Chapter One “Defining Feminism, Religion, and the Study of Religion” reprinted in Theory and Method in the Study of Religion, ed. by Carl Olson (Belmont, CA:Wadsworth, 2004), pp. 511–520
- Buddhism After Patriarchy: A Feminist History, Analysis, and Reconstruction of Buddhism; Albany, NY: State University of New York Press, 1993; Spanish translation, Editorial Trotta, Madrid, Spain, 2005.

== Books edited by Gross ==
- Editor (with Terry Muck): Christians Talk About Buddhist Meditation: Buddhists Talk About Christian Prayer; New York: Continuum, 2003.
- Editor (with Terry Muck): Buddhists Talk About Jesus: Christians Talk About the Buddha; New York: Continuum, 2000.
- Editor (with Nancy A. Falk): Unspoken Worlds: Women's Religious Lives; Belmont, CA: Wadsworth Press, 1989; Third Edition, Wadsworth Press, 2001; Translated into French as La Religion Par Les Femmes, Edition Labor et Fides, 1993.
- Editor (with Nancy A. Falk): Unspoken Worlds: Women's Religious Lives in Non-Western Cultures; San Francisco: Harper and Row, 1980;
- Editor: Beyond Androcentrism: New Essays on Women and Religion; Missoula, MT: Scholars Press, 1977
