= Yeshe Khadro =

Australian ordained Buddhist nun

- Born: Marie Obst; 1950 (age 75–76)
- Occupations: Nurse, Buddhist Nun

Yeshe Khadro is an Australian ordained Buddhist nun who studied under the Dalai Lama.

== Early life ==
Khadro was born in 1950 and grew up in rural Queensland. Her birth name was Marie Obst. She was raised Catholic.

== Career ==
Khadro trained as a nurse at the Princess Alexandra Hospital, Brisbane. In 1972 she left Australia to travel across Asia. She changed her name to Yeshe Khadro which means 'wisdom' and 'walking across the sky'.

In 1973, Khadro was living in Nepal and training with the Dalai Lama. In 1974, she was ordained as a Buddhist nun by the Dalai Lama. She returned to Australia and gifted the land she owned with her partner Nick and others to create a Buddhist commune. This is now known as Chenrezig Institute. She returned to Nepal for two more years before moving back to Australia to run the centre.

Khadro worked for the Karuna Hospice Service, Brisbane, and was appointed director in 1997.

In 2011, Khadro was a key figure in organising the Dalai Lama's trip to Australia.

In 2012, Khadro was named a Paul Harris Fellow by Rotary International "in appreciation of the furtherance of better understanding and friendly relations among peoples of the world".
