= Buddhist feminism =

Movement

Buddhist feminism is a movement that seeks to improve the religious, legal, and social status of women within Buddhism. It is an aspect of feminist theology which seeks to advance and understand the equality of men and women morally, socially, spiritually, and in leadership from a Buddhist perspective. The Buddhist feminist Rita Gross describes Buddhist feminism as "the radical practice of the co-humanity of women and men."

== Buddhist feminism as a recent understanding ==
Parallels between Buddhism and feminist understanding of equality between race, gender, class, sexuality and nationality have only recently begun to be explored. Buddhism's belief in understanding the truth of reality through practicing spiritual development has been deemed beneficial to feminist theory, particularly when compared to other religions. These parallels are undergoing evaluation as religious understandings of feminism become increasingly scrutinized in society and popular discourse.

Certain actions look to explore and connect Buddhist nuns. Their creation of a marginalized community in response to opposing the androcentric order of Buddhism isolated nuns to their respective region and separates them from other places. As nuns were isolated and not interconnected around the world, the Skyadhita, or “Daughters of the Buddha'', was created with one of the goals to connect ordained nuns around the world.

Buddhist nun movements in the last few decades have an organizing emphasis on crossing racial and ethnic boundaries across language differences, tying opposing cultural viewpoints. One of the conflicting views is the cultural stance between Asian and Western values, with the West focusing on individual goals, fostering unique identity, versus Asian identity in connection to community.

== Ordination ==
Some Buddhist feminists advocate for the ordination of women in Buddhism. The ordination of women in Buddhism has been and continues to be practiced in some Buddhist regions, such as East Asia. It is being revived in some countries such as Malaysia, Nepal, and Sri Lanka, as well as newly beginning in Western countries to which Buddhism has recently spread, such as the United States. Other countries have been reluctant to admit women into the Buddhist order, like Burma and Laos.

Monastery nuns shave their heads, take on monastery robes, and pledge vows of celibacy. Buddhist Feminists view this as a threat to the social construction of womanhood. Recent developments in Sri Lanka have given nuns the right to official ordination; however, it is revealed that Sri Lankan nuns have created a marginal culture that separates themselves from the official Buddhist order. Lay nuns are practitioners of Buddhism, yet still hold onto their identity and roles as wives, mothers, and sexual beings.

In 1988, the lineage of Theravada bhikkhunis (fully ordained nuns), was officially established in Nepal. Three Nepali anagarikas were given ordination with the assistance of Fo Guang Shan nuns in Los Angeles. The female Theravada Buddhist communities in Nepal follow Burmese traditions of female renunciation. Some nuns detach from modern society and concentrate their time to meditate and study the Buddha dharma. Some are motivated to pursue the path to avoid traditional marriage and motherhood.

Through research, Darcie Price-Wallace highlights how Tibetan nuns reflect sentiments of feminism through the full ordination of female Buddhists. The findings reveal that the nuns’ attitudes reflect Buddhist soteriological inclusivity, which include ideas of gender equality and how men and women are both similar, and equal. These nuns emphasize gender equality based on the results of their actions rather than equal opportunity to them. They stress the importance of actions over words, directing their focus towards achieving equality through spiritual practices instead of preaching it.

== Criticisms ==
Jean Byrne argues that within Buddhist Feminism, there is a lack of understanding surrounding the realities of societal gender roles. In her paper "Why I Am Not a Buddhist Feminist" she outlines the recent efforts for equality between men and women within the Buddhist Feminist community. However, she also addresses the overemphasis and over-reliance on Buddhism being a strictly egalitarian religion despite conflicting teachings, like how bhikkhunis are expected to bow to male junior monastics regardless of age or experience. Byrne warns that Buddhists should be cautious about how identifying as a Buddhist may affect their commitment to Feminism. Postcolonial critics have advocated the presence of more than one version of Buddhist Feminism, critiquing the work of white liberal feminists like Rita Gross for presenting a myopic, universalist Buddhist feminism rooted in the assumptions of Western white authority. In the process, the voices of non-white Buddhist feminists who do not fit the typical Western ideology are often excluded from discourse.

== Ecofeminism ==
Ecofeminism is the idea of merging the relationship between women and nature, which some followers of the Buddhist faith have critiqued, specifically with Ecofeminism's involvement in the essentialist roles of women. Ecofeminism rejects the idea of essentialism; however, followers of some Buddhism perceive the essentialist perspective as a hindrance to their faith. Ecofeminism has been perceived by some followers of Buddhism as an idea which perceives women to be more ethical than men, which contradicts the Buddhist tradition of rejecting differentiating gender traits. Ecofeminism has been argued by Buddhist feminists like Rita Gross to be an analysis on the intersectionality of oppression regarding gender, class, and environmentalism.

== Sexuality ==
Traditionally, Buddhist teachings on sexuality emphasize desire as one of the sources of suffering. While there are no outright sexual restrictions on the average practitioner (aside from approaching sex with moderation), Monks and Nuns are strictly celibate. Any sexual activity or misconduct can result in expulsion from the monastery. Contemporary perspectives have offered alternative insights into Buddhist teachings and stories through a feminist lens.

Miranda Shaw’s work, “Wild Wise, Passionate: Dakinis in America,” explores the history of Dakinis and yoginis, which Shaw describes as female tantric practitioners of Vajrayana Buddhism, who live together in remote locations. These women, often operating on the fringes of conventional Buddhist practice, were characterized by their outspokenness, passion, and open embrace of eroticism. Historical accounts, primarily from Western missionaries, condemned Dakinis for their “exuberant sensuality and absence of clothing,” branding them prostitutes. Shaw’s interpretation challenges these judgments, emphasizing that Dakinis intentionally reject conventional societal norms to practice their “untamability.” Shaw suggests that Dakinis and yoginis portray a powerful image of a “woman’s capacity to integrate our sensuality, sexuality, and spirituality.”

== See also ==
- Ordination of women in Buddhism
- Sakyadhita International Association of Buddhist Women
- Women in Buddhism
- Ānanda
