= Subhana Barzaghi =

Australian Zen and Buddhist roshi

Zen Roshi Subhana Barzaghi
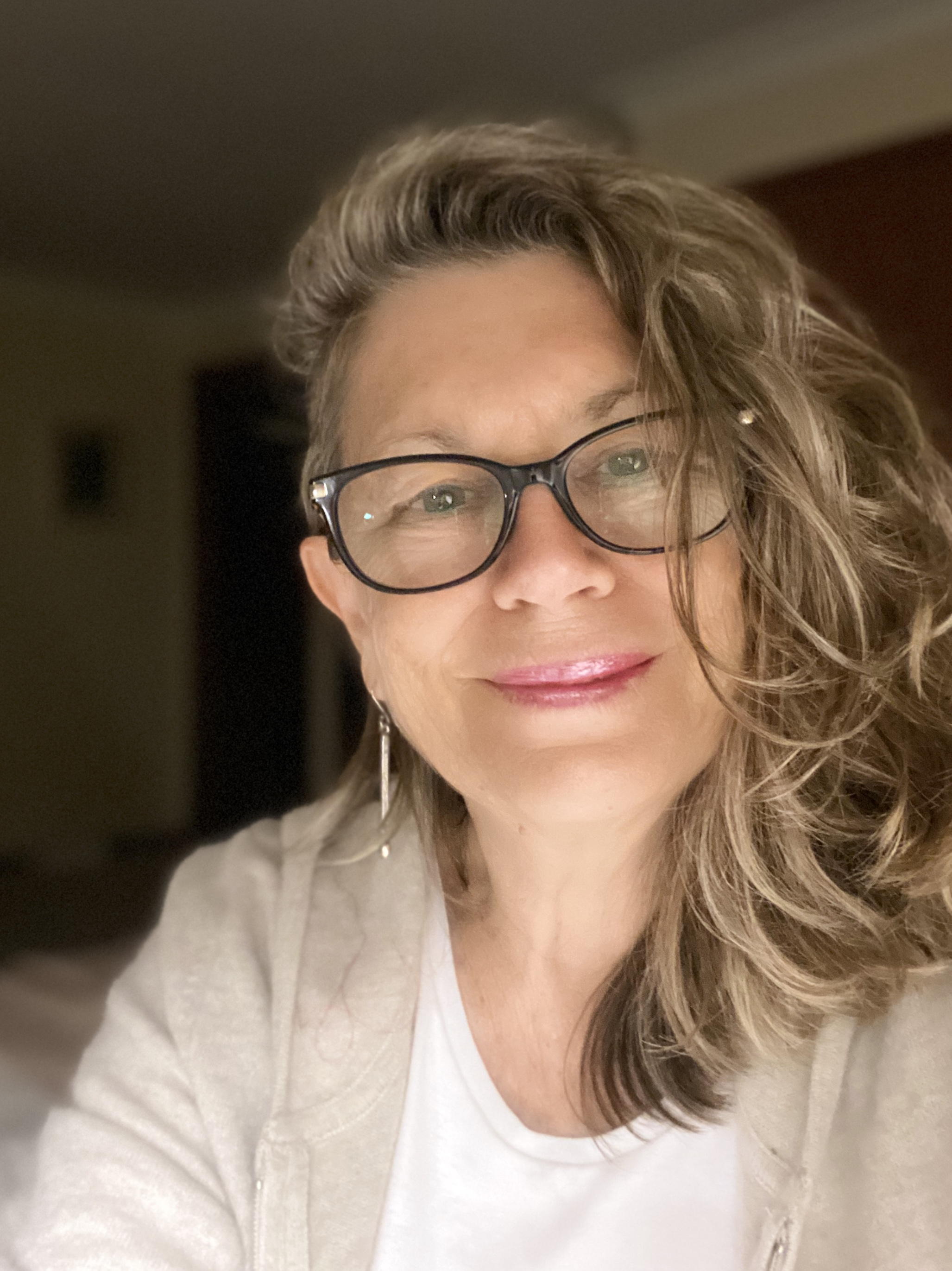
- Barzaghi in 2020

Personal life
- Born: August 1954 (age 71)
- Known for: First female Zen Roshi teacher in Australia
- Other names: Gyo Shin, Myo-Un-An Roshi Subhana Roshi

Religious life
- Philosophy: Zen Buddhism
- Profession: Psychotherapist, Meditation teacher

Senior posting
- Teacher: Robert Aitken Roshi

Subhana Barzaghi was the first female Zen Rōshi in the Diamond Sangha to be given teaching status in Australia and around the world. She achieved this status in 1996.

== Education ==
Barzaghi has a Bachelor of Arts and Social Sciences from Charles Sturt University, a Masters in Applied Psychotherapy from UTS and a Graduate in Hakomi Integrative Psychotherapy.

== Career ==
From 1988 to 1992, Barzaghi worked at the Lismore Base Hospital as a Sexual Assault Counsellor as well as being a generalist counsellor for the Lismore and District Women's Health Centre. She also has a private psychotherapy practise based in Mosman, Sydney.

Barzaghi notes that she spent seven years as a midwife in the bush.

Barzaghi was a founding member of Bodhi Farm, an intentional alternative spiritual community which was started in 1977. She also helped develop the Fundamental Food Store, now known as Fundies Wholefood Market. Barzaghi relationship to food has been deepened through the practice of oryoki. Oryoki is a practise of mindful eating in the Zen tradition. Barzaghi notes that mindfulness deepens the spirit of oryoki because "by slowing down and being really present in your experience, it enhances all the senses."

Australian chef Kylie Kwong reports that Barzaghi "has taught me so much about the importance of taking care of our mind, the importance of ritual and ceremony – in and around food – and how to cultivate quality and true happiness within our day-to-day."

Barzaghi has been instrumental in founding meditation and Buddhist centres across Australia. She was the founder of Kuan Yin Meditation Centre in Lismore and when she moved to Sydney established the Blue Gum Sangha, as part of the Insight meditation tradition.

Barzaghi is a senior guiding teacher in the Insight Meditation tradition in Australia, offering a range of meditation workshops and retreats. Barzaghi is the Director and co-founder of Insight Meditation Institute Inc., a training institute which offers Buddhist based mindfulness and compassion teacher teaching and a Dharma Teacher training and mentoring program.

Barzaghi was one of the original members of the Sydney Zen Centre located in Annandale NSW, who describe themselves as Australia's original Zen Buddhist commity. Barzaghi is a Roshi in the Diamond Sangha, a guiding Roshi for the Sydney Zen Centre and Melbourne Zen Group. Barzaghi teaches intensive Zen sesshins, week-end worships and regular weekly programs.

In addition to her other talents, Barzaghi is an artist and has held exhibilitions at the Sydney Zen Centre in 2011, 2013 and 2014. She has also exhibited her work at the St Albans Gallery and Mary Place, Paddington. Barzaghi is also a writer contributing articles to the quarterly journal of the Sydney Zen Centre 'Mind Moon Circle' and other publications.

== Publications ==
- Barzaghi, Subhana. Wild Grasses and Falling Wattle. (Dharma poetry)
- Barzaghi, S; Coote, G (2007). "Socially Engaged Buddhism". In Gale, F.; Bolzan, N; McRae-McMahon, D. (eds.). Spirited Practices: Spirituality and the Helping Professions. Allen and Unwin. ISBN 9781000247411.
- Barzaghi, S (2010). "The Spiritual Needs of the Aged and Dying: A Buddhist Perspective". Ageing & Spirituality across Faiths and Cultures. London: Jessica Kingsley. ISBN 9781849050067.
- Barzaghi, S (2011). "The Journey of a lay female Zen teacher: 'On a withered tree a flower blooms'". Buddhism in Australia – Traditions in Change. New York: Routledge Critical Studies. ISBN 9781136890789.
