= Ajahn Candasiri =

Buddhist monk

Personal life
- Born: 1947 (age 78–79) Edinburgh, Scotland
- Website: amaravati.org

Religious life
- Religion: Buddhism
- Order: Sīladharā
- School: Theravāda
- Lineage: Forest Tradition of Ajahn Chah
- Ordination: 1983 (43 years ago)

Senior posting
- Teacher: Ajahn Sumedho
- Based in: Amaravati Buddhist Monastery

Ajahn Candasiri is one of the Theravāda Buddhist monastics who co-founded Chithurst Buddhist Monastery in West Sussex, England, a branch monastery of the Ajahn Chah lineage. She is currently ordained as a ten-precept sīladharā, the highest level that is allowed for women in the Thai Forest Tradition. She is one of the senior monastics in western Theravāda Buddhism and trained alongside women who later became fully ordained bhikkhunis and abbesses of monasteries.

Born in 1947, Ajahn Candasiri was raised as a Christian in Edinburgh, Scotland. She worked as an occupational therapist in the United Kingdom after graduation from university. She encountered the Buddha's teachings in 1977 through Ajahn Sumedho, after exploring several meditation traditions. She became a renunciant in 1979, a white-robed, eight-precept anagārikā, at Chithurst Buddhist Monastery.

Ajahn Candasiri was one of four anagārikā women who carved out an existence in the early days of Chithurst Buddhist Monastery, along with a group of monks. In 1979, the monastery was little more than an abandoned, dilapidated house. After the group turned it into a functional residence, the nuns moved to a small house nearby and fixed it up. They called it Āloka Cottage and eventually founded the sīladhārā ordination community there. In 1983, Candasiri took sīladharā ordination (brown robes and ten precepts). It consisted of a unique set of 137 rules and a new version of the Patimokkha recitation created by Ajahn Sumedho so that the women monastics could be trained in Ajahn Chah's lineage. Ajahn Candasiri was one of the pioneer sīladharā monastics who were trained by bhikkhus (fully ordained monks), in parts of the Suttavibhanga and a version of the Vinaya Patimokkha. Some of the sīladharā sisters became skilled Sangha members, capable of keeping the patimokkha, living in harmony and maintaining their community with very few resources.

Ajahn Candasiri and the other sīladharās remained at the Chithurst monastery despite the sīladharās being subordinated to monastic men. Though the sīladharā community grew over the years, some began leaving to seek full Vinaya training. Ajahn Candasiri had stayed in the sīladharā community which shrank to three nuns at one point. She is one of the sīladharās who have been allowed to teach and lead retreats. She lived at Chithurst until 1999 when she moved to Amaravati Buddhist Monastery, where she continues to teach.

She is one of the most senior monastics in the Amaravati Sangha. Since 2015, she has been increasingly resident in Scotland at Milntuim Hermitage in Perthshire. Initially on her own, supported by laywomen staying with her, there is now, in 2020, usually a junior female monastic from Amaravati resident with her, when she is there.

== Publications ==
- The Secret of Happiness. Amaravati Publications (2021). ISBN 978-1-78432-184-0
- Simple Kindness. Amaravati Buddhist Monastery (2012). ISBN 978-1-870205-58-0.
- Friends on the Path. Amaravati Publications (2011). ISBN 978-1-870205-24-5.
- Rituals and Observances. Amaravati Publications (2001). ISBN 1-870205-15-4.
