= Tamdrin Wangmo Kelzang Chokyi Nyima =

Jetsunma Tamdrin Wangmo Kelzang Chokyi Nyima (1836–1896) was a Tibetan Buddhist teacher and vajramaster. She was taught by her father Kunga Richen, her brother Dorje Rinchen, and her paternal uncle, Pema Dudul Wangchuk. She received the three vows (prātimokṣa, bodhisattva and tantric) from the abbot of Sakya's Lhakhang Chenmo, Tashi Chopel. Later she was taught by the Fifty-third Ngor Khenchen, Jampa Kunga Tenpai Lodro, who gave her the complete Lamdre Lobshe as well as the major empowerment of the forty-five deities in Vajramāla, Hevajra, Vajrayoginī of the Nāropa tradition, Vajrakīlaya, Mahākāla Daṇḍa, Vajrapāṇi Bhūtaḍāmara, and Kurukulle.

She taught her brother and other disciples.

Upon her death she was given similar honors as the male lineage holders of the Khon family, as she had been in life, and a life-size silver Nāropa Vajrayoginī with gilded gold and inlaid with precious gems was made as her reliquary.

She is considered by the Sakya tradition as an emanation of Vajra Nairātmyā and Vajravārahī.
