= Kushok Chimey Luding =

Jetsunma Kushok Chimey Luding is a Buddhist teacher born in Tibet (1938). She is a Jetsunma ("Venerable women"). This title is comun when a woman was born in a traditional Tibetan family.

Also is the sister of the current head of the Sakya lineage, Sakya Trizin, and the daughter of the previous head of the Sakya lineage, Vajradhara Ngawang Kunga Rinchen. Abiding by family tradition, she took novice ordination at seven years old. Her mother, sister, younger brother, and father died before she was a teenager. In 1959 she left Tibet for India.

In 1971 she moved with her husband and three sons to Canada, where she now lives. Sakya Trizin requested she begin teaching, which she began in the early 1980s. She is now a full-time dharma teacher and the founder of Sakya Thubten Tsechen Ling dharma centre in Vancouver, and Sakya Dechen Ling in Oakland, California.

She is one of fewer than a dozen masters who are qualified to transmit the Lam Dre. She is considered an emanation of Vajrayogini.
