= Pramāda =

Translations of Pramāda
- English: heedlessness, carelessness, unconcern
- Sanskrit: Pramāda, pramada
- Chinese: 放逸
- Tibetan: བག་མེད་པ། (Wylie: bag med pa; THL: bakmepa)
- Vietnamese: phóng dật phóng túng dễ duôi lơ là

Pramāda (Sanskrit; Pāli: pamada; Tibetan phonetic: bakmepa) is a Buddhist term that is translated as "heedlessness", "carelessness", etc. In the Mahayana tradition, pramāda is defined to not apply oneself earnestly and carefully to adopting a wholesome attitude and abandoning unwholesome actions.

Pramāda is identified as:

- One of the twenty secondary unwholesome factors within the Mahayana Abhidharma teachings

== Definitions ==
Mipham Rinpoche states:

Heedlessness (pramāda) is to not apply oneself earnestly and carefully to adopting virtue and abandoning evil deeds, and is due to the three poisons along with laziness (kausīdya). It is the opponent of conscientiousness (apramāda), and its function is to increase non-virtue and to diminish virtue.

The Abhidharma-samuccaya states:

What is unconcern (pramāda)? It is to persevere in passion-lust (raga), aversion-hatred (dvesha), and bewilderment-erring (moha) aggravated by laziness (kausīdya). It is not to attend to what is positive and so also is not to protect the mind from those things which cannot provide lasting satisfaction. It provides it basis for increasing the unhealthy state and decreasing healthy ones.

Alexander Berzin explains:

Based on longing desire (raga), hostility (dvesha), naivety (moha), or laziness (kausīdya), not caring is the state of mind not to engage in anything constructive and not to restrain from activities tainted with confusion. It is not taking seriously and thus not caring about the effects of our behavior.

== See also ==
- Kleshas (Buddhism)
- Mental factors (Buddhism)

== Sources ==
- Guenther, Herbert V. & Leslie S. Kawamura (1975), Mind in Buddhist Psychology: A Translation of Ye-shes rgyal-mtshan's "The Necklace of Clear Understanding" Dharma Publishing. Kindle Edition.
- Kunsang, Erik Pema (translator) (2004). Gateway to Knowledge, Vol. 1. North Atlantic Books.
- Nina van Gorkom (2010), Cetasikas, Zolag
