= Kaukritya =

Translations of Kaukritya
- English: regret worry
- Sanskrit: kaukritya, kaukṛitya
- Pali: kukkucca
- Burmese: ကုက္ကုစ္စ
- Chinese: 惡作 (T) / 恶作 (S) 悔 (T) / 悔 (S)
- Indonesian: penyesalan kekhawatiran
- Korean: 악작, 오작, 회 (RR: akjak, ojak, hoi)
- Tibetan: འགྱོད་པ། (Wylie: 'gyod pa; THL: gyöpa)
- Vietnamese: Hối

Kaukritya (Sanskrit; Pali: kukkucca; Tibetan phonetic: gyöpa) is a Buddhist term that is translated as "regret", "worry", etc. In the Theravada tradition, kukkucca is defined as worry or remorse after having done wrong; it has the characteristic of regret. In the Mahayana tradition, kaukritya is defined as sadness because of mental displeasure with a former action.

Kaukritya (Pali: kukkucca) is identified as:

- One of the fourteen unwholesome mental factors within the Theravada Abhidharma teachings
- One of the four changeable mental factors within the Mahayana Abhidharma teachings
- One of the five hindrances to meditation (in combination with uddhacca)

== Explanations ==
=== Theravada ===
Bhikkhu Bodhi explains:

Kukkucca is worry or remorse after having done wrong. Its characteristic is subsequent regret. Its function is to sorrow over what has and what has not been done. It is manifested as remorse. Its proximate cause is what has and what has not been done (i.e. wrongs of commission and omission).

The Atthasālinī (II, Book II, Part IX, Chapter III, 258) gives the following definition of kukkucca:

...It has repentance as characteristic, sorrow at deeds of commission and omission as function, regret as manifestation, deeds of commission and omission as proximate cause, and it should be regarded as a state of bondage.

Nina van Gorkom explains:

The characteristic of kukkucca is repentance. Repentance is generally considered a virtue, but the reality of kukkucca is not wholesome, it arises with dosa-mūla-citta (see Dvesha_(Buddhism)). Kukkucca which “regrets” the commission of evil and the omission of kusala is different from wholesome thinking about the disadvantages of akusala and the value of kusala. The conventional term “worry” which is also used as translation of kukkucca may not be clear either. When we say that we worry, it may not be the reality of kukkucca but it may be thinking with aversion about an unpleasant object without there being kukkucca. For example, we may worry about the way how to solve a problem in the future; this kind of worry is not the reality of kukkucca.

=== Mahayana ===
The Abhidharma-samuccaya states:

What is kaukritya? It is an obsession regarding the positive, negative, indifferent, timely, untimely, appropriate and inappropriate on account of anything to be done intentionally or unintentionally and is related to bewilderment-erring. Its function is to obstruct the mind from becoming settled.

Mipham Rinpoche states:

Regret involves sadness because of mental displeasure with a former action. It obstructs resting the mind.

Alexander Berzin explains:

Regret (‘gyod-pa) is a part of naivety (moha). It is the state of mind that does not wish to repeat doing something, either proper or improper, that we did or that someone else made us do.

== See also ==
- Mental factors (Buddhism)
- Moha (Buddhism)

== Sources ==
- Berzin, Alexander (2006), Primary Minds and the 51 Mental Factors
- Bhikkhu Bodhi (2003), A Comprehensive Manual of Abhidhamma, Pariyatti Publishing
- Guenther, Herbert V. & Leslie S. Kawamura (1975), Mind in Buddhist Psychology: A Translation of Ye-shes rgyal-mtshan's "The Necklace of Clear Understanding" Dharma Publishing. Kindle Edition.
- Kunsang, Erik Pema (translator) (2004). Gateway to Knowledge, Vol. 1. North Atlantic Books.
- Nina van Gorkom (2010), Cetasikas, Zolag
