= Mātsarya =

Miserliness in Buddhism

Translations of Matsarya
- English: avarice, envy/jealousy
- Sanskrit: matsarya, mātsarya
- Pali: macchariya
- Burmese: မစ္ဆရိယ
- Chinese: 慳
- Indonesian: kekikiran; kikir
- Tibetan: སེར་སྣ། (Wylie: ser sna; THL: serna)
- Vietnamese: Lận

Mātsarya (Sanskrit; Pali: macchariya; Tibetan phonetic: serna) is a Buddhist/Hindu term translated as "stinginess" or "miserliness". It is defined as being incapable of enjoying one’s own possessions and other material objects, clinging to them and being unwilling to part with them or share them with others.

It is identified as:

- One of the twenty subsidiary unwholesome mental factors within the Mahayana Abhidharma teachings.
- One of the fourteen unwholesome mental factors within the Theravada Abhidharma teachings.
- One of the ten fetters in the Theravada tradition (according to the Dhammasangani)

== Definitions ==
=== Theravada ===
The Atthasālinī (II, Book I, Part IX, Chapter II, 257) gives the following definition of avarice (meanness):

It has, as characteristic, the concealing of one's property, either attained or about to be attained; the not enduring the sharing of one's property in common with others, as function; the shrinking from such sharing or niggardliness or sour feeling as manifestation; one's own property as proximate cause; and it should be regarded as mental ugliness.

=== Mahayana ===
The Abhidharma-samuccaya states:

What is matsarya? It is an over-concern with the material things in life stemming from over-attachment to wealth and honor, and it belongs to passion-lust. Avarice functions as the basis for not letting up in one's concern for the material things of life.

Alexander Berzin explains:

Miserliness (ser-sna) is a part of longing desire (Sanskrit: raga) and is an attachment to material gain or respect and, not wanting to give up any possessions, clings to them and does not want to share them with others or use them ourselves. Thus, miserliness is more than the English word stinginess. Stinginess is merely unwillingness to share or to use something we possess. It lacks the aspect of hoarding that miserliness possesses.

== In Literature ==
=== Avadānaśataka ===
In the Avadānaśataka it is stated that mātsarya gives rise to "faults" (dosa) if it is practised, developed and cultivated. These faults manifest in wrong action and the thought that these actions are just arises. If one embraces the ignoble dharma, the unjust vision of justice, it leads to a faulty logic that results in perverse conclusions. They start to shift the blame away from themselves. The people who begin to cultivate more and more mātsarya can be reborn in the hungry ghost realm. One reason why mātsarya and hungry ghosts where associated with one other could be that the writer thought of those who embraced mātsarya being so mentally twisted by their faults that they are as deficient as hungry ghosts. Two ways to avoid mātsarya is to abandon it and the other is to be charitable. Giving gifts and making offerings are two good ways to stop mātsarya to take hold of thoughts and avoid a rebirth as an hungry ghost.

== See also ==
- Mental factors (Buddhism)

== Sources ==
- Berzin, Alexander (2006), Primary Minds and the 51 Mental Factors
- Goleman, Daniel (2008). Destructive Emotions: A Scientific Dialogue with the Dalai Lama. Bantam. Kindle Edition.
- Guenther, Herbert V. & Leslie S. Kawamura (1975), Mind in Buddhist Psychology: A Translation of Ye-shes rgyal-mtshan's "The Necklace of Clear Understanding". Dharma Publishing. Kindle Edition.
- Kunsang, Erik Pema (translator) (2004). Gateway to Knowledge, Vol. 1. North Atlantic Books.
