= Styāna =

Translations of Styāna
- English: sloth lethargy gloominess foggymindedness
- Sanskrit: styāna
- Pali: thīna
- Chinese: 惛沉
- Indonesian: kemalasan
- Tibetan: རྨུག་པ། (Wylie: rmug pa; THL: mukpa)
- Vietnamese: Hôn trầm

Styāna (Sanskrit; Tibetan phonetic: mukpa) or thīna (Pali) is a Buddhist term that is translated as "sloth", "lethargy", "gloominess", etc. In the Mahayana tradition, styāna is defined as a mental factor that causes the mind to be withdrawn, unclear, and unable to focus. Thīna is defined as sluggishness or dullness of mind, characterized by a lack of driving power. In the Theravada tradition, thīna is said to occur in conjunction with middha (torpor), which is defined as a morbid state that is characterized by unwieldiness, lack of energy, and opposition to wholesome activity. The two mental factors in conjunction are expressed as thīna-middha (sloth-torpor).

Styāna or thīna is identified as:

- One of the five hindrances to meditation practice (in combination with middha, i.e. as sloth-torpor)
- One of the fourteen unwholesome mental factors within the Theravada Abhidharma teachings
- Closely related to the Sanskrit term kausīdya (spiritual sloth), that is identified as one of the twenty secondary unwholesome factors within the Mahayana Abhidharma teachings

== Definitions ==
=== Theravada ===
Bhikkhu Bodhi explains:

Sloth is sluggish or dullness of mind. Its characteristic is lack of driving power. Its function is to dispel energy. It is manifested as the sinking of the mind. Its proximate cause is unwise attention to boredom, drowsiness, etc. Sloth and torpor (middha]) always occur in conjunction, and are opposed to energy (viriya). Sloth is identified as sickness of consciousness (citta-gelanna), torpor as sickness of the mental factors (kayagelanna). As a pair, they constitute one of the five hindrances, which is overcome by initial application (vitakka).

The Atthasālinī (II, Book I, Part IX, Chapter II, 255) states about sloth and torpor: “Absence of striving, difficulty through inability, is the meaning.” We then read the following definitions of sloth and torpor:

The compound “sloth-torpor” is sloth plus torpor; of which sloth has absence of, or opposition to striving as characteristic, destruction of energy as function, sinking of associated states as manifestation; torpor has unwieldiness as characteristic, closing the doors of consciousness as function, shrinking in taking the object, or drowsiness as manifestation; and both have unsystematic thought, in not arousing oneself from discontent and laziness (or indulgence), as proximate cause.

Nina van Gorkom explains:

When there are sloth and torpor there is no energy, no vigour to perform dāna, to observe sīla, to listen to Dhamma, to study the Dhamma or to develop calm, no energy to be mindful of the reality which appears now.

=== Mahayana ===
The Abhidharma-samuccaya states:

What is gloominess' It is the way in which the mind cannot function properly and is associated with moha. Its function is to aid all basic and proximate emotions.

Mipham Rinpoche states:

Lethargy belongs to the category of delusion. It means to be withdrawn, mentally incapable, and unable to focus on an object because of heaviness of body and mind. It forms the support for the disturbing emotions.

Alexander Berzin explains:

Foggymindedness (rmugs-pa) is a part of naivety (moha). It is a heavy feeling of body and mind that makes the mind unclear, unserviceable, and incapable either of giving rise to a cognitive appearance of its object or of apprehending the object correctly. When the mind actually becomes unclear, due to foggymindedness, this is mental dullness (bying-ba).

== See also ==
- Mental factors (Buddhism)
- Kleshas (Buddhism)

== Sources ==
- Berzin, Alexander (2006), Primary Minds and the 51 Mental Factors
- Bhikkhu Bodhi (2003), A Comprehensive Manual of Abhidhamma, Pariyatti Publishing
- Guenther, Herbert V. & Leslie S. Kawamura (1975), Mind in Buddhist Psychology: A Translation of Ye-shes rgyal-mtshan's "The Necklace of Clear Understanding" Dharma Publishing. Kindle Edition.
- Kunsang, Erik Pema (translator) (2004). Gateway to Knowledge, Vol. 1. North Atlantic Books.
- Nina van Gorkom (2010), Cetasikas, Zolag
