= Pradāśa =

Translations of Pradāśa
- English: spite, spitefulness, annoyance
- Sanskrit: pradāśa
- Chinese: 惱
- Tibetan: འཚིག་པ། (Wylie: 'tshig pa; THL: tsikpa)

Pradāśa (Sanskrit; Tibetan phonetic: tsikpa) is a Buddhist term translated as "spite" or "spitefulness". It is defined as an attitude based on fury/indignation (krodha) and resentment (upanāha) in which one is unable or unwilling to forgive; it causes one to utter harsh words. It is one of the twenty subsidiary unwholesome mental factors within the Mahayana Abhidharma teachings.

The Abhidharma-samuccaya states:

What is spite (pradāśa)? It is a vindictive attitude preceded by fury/indignation (krodha) and resentment (upanāha)–forming part of anger–and its function is to become the basis for harsh and strong words, to increase what is not meritorious, and not to allow one to feel happy.

Spite is a derivative of anger (pratigha).

== See also ==
- Mental factors (Buddhism)

== Sources ==
- Goleman, Daniel (2008), Destructive Emotions: A Scientific Dialogue with the Dalai Lama, Bantam, Kindle Edition
- Guenther, Herbert V. (1975), Mind in Buddhist Psychology: A Translation of Ye-shes rgyal-mtshan's "The Necklace of Clear Understanding", Dharma Publishing, Kindle Edition
- Kunsang, Erik Pema (2004), Gateway to Knowledge, Vol. 1, North Atlantic Books
