= Śāṭhya =

Buddhist term

Translations of Śāṭhya
- English: hypocrisy, dishonesty, deception, concealment of shortcomings
- Sanskrit: Śāṭhya
- Chinese: 諂
- Tibetan: གཡོ། (Wylie: g.yo; THL: yo)

Śāṭhya (Sanskrit; Tibetan phonetic: yo) is a Buddhist term translated as "hypocrisy", "dishonesty", "deception", or "concealment of shortcomings". It is identified as one of the twenty subsidiary unwholesome mental factors within the Mahayana Abhidharma teachings. In this context, it is defined as concealing one's own faults because of a desire for things such as honor and material gain.

== Definitions ==
The Abhidharma-samuccaya states:

What is dishonesty? In one's desire for wealth and honor, one deceitfully makes non-virtue seem virtuous by associating with both attachment (raga) and ignorance (moha). It provides an obstacle for getting good counsel.

Alexander Berzin explains:

Concealment of shortcomings (g.yo) is a part of longing desire (raga) and naivety (moha). Because of excessive attachment to our material gain and the respect we receive, this is the state of mind to hide our shortcomings and faults from others.

== See also ==
- Mental factors (Buddhism)

== Sources ==
- Berzin, Alexander (2006), Primary Minds and the 51 Mental Factors
- Goleman, Daniel (2008). Destructive Emotions: A Scientific Dialogue with the Dalai Lama. Bantam. Kindle Edition.
- Guenther, Herbert V. & Leslie S. Kawamura (1975), Mind in Buddhist Psychology: A Translation of Ye-shes rgyal-mtshan's "The Necklace of Clear Understanding". Dharma Publishing. Kindle Edition.
- Kunsang, Erik Pema (translator) (2004). Gateway to Knowledge, Vol. 1. North Atlantic Books.
