= Vihiṃsā =

Translations of Vihiṃsā
- English: malice, hostility, cruelty, intention to harm
- Sanskrit: vihiṃsā
- Chinese: 害
- Japanese: 害 (Rōmaji: Gai)
- Tibetan: རྣམ་པར་འཚེ་བ། (Wylie: rnam par 'tshe ba; THL: nampar tsewa)

Vihiṃsā (Sanskrit; Tibetan phonetic: nampar tsewa) is a Buddhist term translated as "malice", "hostility", or "cruelty". It is identified as one of the twenty subsidiary unwholesome mental factors within the Mahayana Abhidharma teachings. In this context, it is defined as the category of anger (pratigha) or aversion (dvesha), and functions to treat others abusively and without compassion.

== Definitions ==
The Abhidharma-samuccaya states:

What is vihiṃsā? It belongs to the emotion anger (pratigha), lacks loving kindness, pity, and affection, and has the function of treating others abusively.

Herbert Guenther explains:

It is the desire to treat others abusively (40b) without having kind feelings towards living beings.

Mipham Rinpoche states:

Vihiṃsā belongs to the category of anger (pratigha). Its function is to be uncompassionate and to cause harm

Alexander Berzin explains:

Cruelty (rnam-par ‘tshe-ba) is a part of hostility (dvesha) and has three forms.
- Hooliganism (snying-rje-ba med-pa) is a cruel lack of compassion with which we wish to cause mischief or harm to others.
- Self-destructiveness (snying-brtse-ba med-pa) is a cruel lack of self-love with which we wish to cause mischief or harm to ourselves.
- Taking perverse pleasure (brtse-ba med-pa) is cruelly rejoicing when seeing or hearing of others’ suffering.

== See also ==
- Mental factors (Buddhism)

== Sources ==
- Berzin, Alexander (2006), Primary Minds and the 51 Mental Factors
- Goleman, Daniel (2008). Destructive Emotions: A Scientific Dialogue with the Dalai Lama. Bantam. Kindle Edition.
- Guenther, Herbert V. & Leslie S. Kawamura (1975), Mind in Buddhist Psychology: A Translation of Ye-shes rgyal-mtshan's "The Necklace of Clear Understanding". Dharma Publishing. Kindle Edition.
- Kunsang, Erik Pema (translator) (2004). Gateway to Knowledge, Vol. 1. North Atlantic Books.
