= Āśraddhya =

Translations of Āśraddhya
- English: lack of faith lack of trust disbelieving a fact
- Sanskrit: Āśraddhya, ashraddhya
- Chinese: 不信
- Tibetan: མ་དད་པ། (Wylie: ma dad pa; THL: madepa)

Āśraddhya (Sanskrit; Tibetan phonetic: trel mepa) is a Buddhist term that is translated as "lack of faith", "lack of trust", etc. In the Mahayana tradition, Āśraddhya is defined as a mental factor that is characterized by a lack of trust, interest, or desire for wholesome things.

Āśraddhya is identified as:

- One of the twenty secondary unwholesome factors within the Mahayana Abhidharma teachings.

== Definitions ==
The Abhidharma-samuccaya states:

What is lack of trust (Āśhraddhya)? It is the mind associated with the category bewilderment erring (moha) which does not have deep conviction, has lack of trust, and has no desire for things positive. It provides the basis for laziness (kausidya).

Mipham Rinpoche states:

Lack of faith (Āśhraddhya) belongs to the category of delusion (moha). It is to not be interested in what is true and virtuous. It forms the support for laziness (kausidya).

Alexander Berzin explains:

Disbelieving a fact (Āśhraddhya; Tibetan: ma-dad-pa) is a part of naivety (moha) which has three forms that are contrary to the three forms of believing a fact to be true.
- Disbelieving a fact that is based on reason, such as disbelieving behavioral cause and effect.
- Disbelieving a fact, such as the good qualities of the Three Jewels of Refuge, such that it causes our mind to become muddied with disturbing emotions and attitudes making us unhappy.
- Disbelieving a fact, such as the existence of the possibility for us to attain liberation, such that we have no interest in it and no aspiration to attain it.

== See also ==
- Faith in Buddhism
- Mental factors (Buddhism)
- Kleshas (Buddhism)

== Sources ==
- Berzin, Alexander (2006), Mind and Mental Factors: The Fifty-one Types of Subsidiary Awareness
- Bhikkhu Bodhi (2003), A Comprehensive Manual of Abhidhamma, Pariyatti Publishing
- Guenther, Herbert V. & Leslie S. Kawamura (1975), Mind in Buddhist Psychology: A Translation of Ye-shes rgyal-mtshan's "The Necklace of Clear Understanding" Dharma Publishing. Kindle Edition.
- Kunsang, Erik Pema (translator) (2004). Gateway to Knowledge, Vol. 1. North Atlantic Books.
- Nina van Gorkom (2010), Cetasikas, Zolag
