= Īrṣyā =

Sanskrit or Buddhist term that is translated as "jealousy" or "envy"

Translations of irshya
- English: jealousy, envy
- Sanskrit: irshya, īrṣyā
- Pali: issā
- Chinese: 嫉
- Indonesian: iri hati; iri
- Khmer: ឫស្យា (UNGEGN: reusya)
- Tibetan: ཕྲག་དོག (Wylie: phrag dog; THL: tradok)
- Thai: ริษยา (RTGS: ritsaya)
- Vietnamese: Tật

Īrṣyā (Sanskrit; Pali: issā; Tibetan: phrag dog) is a Sanskrit or Buddhist term that is translated as "jealousy" or "envy". It is defined as a state of mind in which one is highly agitated to obtain wealth and honor for oneself, but unable to bear the excellence of others.

Irshya is identified as:

- One of the fourteen unwholesome mental factors within the Theravada Abhidharma teachings
- Belonging to the category of dosa within the Theravada tradition
- One of the ten fetters in the Theravada tradition (according to the Dhammasangani)
- One of the twenty subsidiary unwholesome mental factors within the Mahayana Abhidharma teachings
- One of the five poisons within the Mahayana tradition
- Belonging to the category of anger (Sanskrit: pratigha) within the Mahayana tradition

== See also ==
- Kleshas (Buddhism)
- Mental factors (Buddhism)
- Three poisons

== Sources ==
- Berzin, Alexander (2006), Primary Minds and the 51 Mental Factors
- Goleman, Daniel (2008). Destructive Emotions: A Scientific Dialogue with the Dalai Lama. Bantam. Kindle Edition.
- Guenther, Herbert V. & Leslie S. Kawamura (1975), Mind in Buddhist Psychology: A Translation of Ye-shes rgyal-mtshan's "The Necklace of Clear Understanding" Dharma Publishing. Kindle Edition.
- Kunsang, Erik Pema (translator) (2004). Gateway to Knowledge, Vol. 1. North Atlantic Books.
