= Mada (Buddhism) =

Translations of Mada
- English: self-satisfaction, self-infatuation, mental inflation, smugness, conceit
- Sanskrit: mada
- Chinese: 憍
- Japanese: 驕 (Rōmaji: kyo)
- Tibetan: རྒྱགས་པ། (Wylie: rgyags pa; THL: gyakpa)

Mada (Sanskrit; Tibetan phonetic: gyakpa ) is a Buddhist term translated as "self-satisfaction", "self-infatuation", or "mental inflation". It is identified as one of the twenty subsidiary unwholesome mental factors within the Mahayana Abhidharma teachings. In this context, it is defined as having excessive pride or vanity based on attachment to one's own good fortune, such as possessing youth, good health, or material wealth.

== Definitions ==
The Abhidharma-samuccaya states:

What is mada? It is joy and rapture associated with attachment (raga) because one sees as excellences the prospect of a long life and other fragile good things by trusting one's youth and good health. Its function is to provide a basis for all basic and proximate emotions.

Herbert Guenther explains:

It is an inflated mind which is full of joy and rapture in view of health, abundance of pleasure, etc. It is the root of unconcern (pramāda) by generating all other emotions.

Mipham Rinpoche states:

Mada is to have excessive pride or vanity due to any kind of fascination with or attachment towards any kind of conditioned prosperity possessed by oneself, such as good health and youthfulness. It forms a support for the six root unwholesome mental factors and twenty subsidiary unwholesome mental factors.

Alexander Berzin explains:

Smugness or conceit (rgyags-pa) is a part of longing desire (raga). From seeing signs of a long life or of any other samsaric glory, based on being healthy, young, wealthy, and so on, smugness is a puffed-up mind that feels happy about and takes pleasure in this.

== See also ==
- Mental factors (Buddhism)

== Sources ==
- Berzin, Alexander (2006), Primary Minds and the 51 Mental Factors
- Goleman, Daniel (2008). Destructive Emotions: A Scientific Dialogue with the Dalai Lama. Bantam. Kindle Edition.
- Guenther, Herbert V. & Leslie S. Kawamura (1975), Mind in Buddhist Psychology: A Translation of Ye-shes rgyal-mtshan's "The Necklace of Clear Understanding". Dharma Publishing. Kindle Edition.
- Kunsang, Erik Pema (translator) (2004). Gateway to Knowledge, Vol. 1. North Atlantic Books.
