= Sparśa =

Translations of Sparśa
- English: contact, contacting awareness, rapport, sense impression, touch, etc.
- Sanskrit: स्पर्श, sparśa
- Pali: phassa
- Bengali: স্পর্শ (sporsho) ছোঁয়া
- Burmese: ဖဿ
- Chinese: 觸 or 触
- Japanese: soku
- Korean: 촉 (RR: chok)
- Sinhala: ස්පර්ශ (sparsha)
- Tagalog: spalsa
- Tibetan: རེག་པ་ (Wylie: reg pa; THL: rekpa)
- Thai: ผัสสะ (RTGS: phatsa) lit. 'สัมผัส' (RTGS: Samphat)
- Vietnamese: xúc

The 12 Nidānas:
Ignorance
↓
Formations
↓
Consciousness
↓
Name & Form
↓
Six Sense Bases
↓
Contact
↓
Feeling
↓
Craving
↓
Clinging
↓
Becoming
↓
Birth
↓
Old Age & Death

Sparśa (Sanskrit: स्पर्श; Pali: phassa) is a Sanskrit term that is translated as "contact", "touching", "sensation", "sense impression", etc. It is defined as the coming together of three factors: the sense organ, the sense object, and sense consciousness (vijnana). For example, contact (sparsha) is said to occur at the coming together of the eye organ, a visual object, and the visual sense consciousness.

Sparśa is identified within the Buddhist teachings as:

- One of the seven universal mental factors in the Theravada Abhidharma.
- One of the five universal mental factors in the Mahayana Abhidharma
- The sixth link in the twelve links of dependent origination

== Explanation ==
=== Theravada ===
The Atthasālinī (Expositor, Part IV, Chapter I, 108) states:

Contact means “it touches”. It has touching as its salient characteristic, impact as its function, “coinciding” (of the physical base, object and consciousness) as its manifestation, and the object which has entered the avenue (of awareness) as proximate cause.

Nina van Gorkom explains:

Phassa is manifested by coinciding or concurrence, namely, by the coinciding of three factors: physical base (vatthu), object and consciousness.

When there is seeing, there is the coinciding of eye (the eyebase), visible object and seeing-consciousness; through this concurrence phassa, which is in this case eye-contact, is manifested.

Nina van Gorkom also explains:

Phassa is different from what we mean in conventional language by physical contact or touch. When we use the word contact in conventional language we may think of the impingement of something external on one of the senses, for example the impingement of hardness on the bodysense. We may use words such as touching or impingement in order to describe phassa, but we should not forget that phassa is nāma, a cetasika which arises together with the citta and assists the citta so that it can experience the object which presents itself through the appropriate doorway. When hardness presents itself through the bodysense there is phassa, contact, arising together with the citta which experiences the hardness. Phassa is not the mere collision of hardness with the bodysense, it is not touch in the physical sense. Impact is the function of phassa in the sense that it assists the citta so that it can cognize the object.

=== Mahayana ===
The Abhidharma-samuccaya states:

What is sparsha (contact)? It is it determination, a transformation in the controlling power, which is in accordance with the three factors coming together. Its function is to provide it basis for feeling.

Herbert Guenther explains:

It is an awareness in which a pleasant [or unpleasant or neutral] feeling is felt when the object, sensory capacity, and cognitive process have come together and which is restricted to the appropriate object. Transformation in the controlling power means that when the visual sense meets a pleasant object [for example] and the feeling becomes the cause of adhering to this pleasure, rapport [sparsha] restricts the pleasant color-form and the feeling becomes the cause of pleasure.

=== Six classes ===
The Theravada and Mahayana traditions both identify six "classes" of contact:

- eye-contact
- ear-contact
- nose-contact
- tongue-contact
- body-contact
- mind-contact

For example, when the ear sense and a sound object are present, the associated auditory consciousness (Pali: viññāṇa) arises. The arising of these three elements (dhātu) – ear-sense, sound and auditory consciousness – lead to "contact" (phassa).

== Within the twelve nidanas ==
Sparśa is the sixth of the Twelve Nidānas. It is conditioned by the presence of the six sense-openings (ṣaḍāyatana), and in turn is a condition for the arising of pleasant, unpleasant or neutral 'sensations' or 'feelings' (vedanā).

Dan Lusthaus explains:

sparśa (P. phassa) - Literally 'touch' or 'sensory contact'. This term accrued varied usages in later Indian thought, but here it simply means that the sense organs are 'in contact with' sensory objects. The circuit of intentionality, or to borrow Merleau-Ponty's term intentional arc, is operational. This term could be translated as 'sensation' as long as this is qualified as a constitutional, active process that is invariably contextualized within its psycho-cognitive dimensions. For Buddhists, sensation can neither be passive nor purely a physical or neurological matter. When the proper sensorial conditions aggregate, i.e., come into contact with each other, sensation occurs. These proper conditions include a properly functioning sense organ and a cognitive-sensory object, which already presuppose a linguistically-complex conscious body (nāma-rūpa).

Jeffrey Hopkins explains:

Roughly speaking, [sparsha refers to] the coming together of an object, a sense organ, and a moment of consciousness. Hence contact, in the twelve links, refers to contact with a sense-object and the subsequent discrimination of the object as attractive, unattractive, or neutral. Sense objects are always present, and thus when a sense organ—the subtle matter that allows you to see, hear, and so forth—develops, an eye consciousness, ear consciousness, nose consciousness, tongue consciousness, or body consciousness will be produced.

Alexander Berzin provides an explanation of the sixth link in the context of the development of the fetus; he states:

The sixth of the twelve links of dependent arising. The subsidiary awareness (mental factor) of contacting awareness [sparsha] during the period of time in the development of a fetus when the distinguishing aggregate and such other affecting variables as contacting awareness are functioning, but the feeling aggregate is not yet functioning. During this period, one experiences contacting awareness of objects as pleasant, unpleasant, or neutral, but does not feel happy, unhappy, or neutral in response to this.

== Within the five aggregates ==
In terms of the Five Aggregates, sparśa is the implicit basis by which Form (rūpa) and Consciousness (viññāna) lead to the mental factors of Feeling (vedanā), Perception (sañña) and Formations (sankhāra).

The Five Aggregates (pañcakkhandha)
according to the Pali Canon.

form (rūpa)
4 elements (mahābhūta)
	↓
	contact (phassa)
↓	↑
consciousness (viññāna)

→
←

←

mental factors (cetasika)
feeling (vedanā)
perception (sañña)
formation (saṅkhāra)

- Form is derived from the Four Great Elements.
- Consciousness arises from other aggregates.
- Mental Factors arise from the Contact of
  Consciousness and other aggregates.
- The five aggregates are no-self.

Source: MN 109 (Thanissaro, 2001) | diagram details

== Alternate translations ==
- Contact (Erik Pema Kusang, Jeffrey Hopkins, Nina van Gorkom)
- Contacting awareness (Alexander Berzin)
- Rapport (Herbert Guenther)
- Sensation (Dan Lusthaus)
- Sense impression
- Touch (Jeffrey Hopkins)
- Touching (Jeffrey Hopkins)

== See also ==
- Ayatana (sense bases)
- Mental factors (Buddhism)
- Skandha (aggregates)
- Asparsa yoga

== Sources ==
- Bhikkhu Bodhi (2003), A Comprehensive Manual of Abhidhamma, Pariyatti Publishing
- Dalai Lama (1992). The Meaning of Life, translated and edited by Jeffrey Hopkins, Boston: Wisdom.
- Dan Lusthaus, Buddhist Phenomenology
- Guenther, Herbert V. & Leslie S. Kawamura (1975), Mind in Buddhist Psychology: A Translation of Ye-shes rgyal-mtshan's "The Necklace of Clear Understanding" Dharma Publishing. Kindle Edition.
- Kunsang, Erik Pema (translator) (2004). Gateway to Knowledge, Vol. 1. North Atlantic Books.
- Nina van Gorkom (2010), ''Cetasikas'', Zolag

Preceded by Ṣaḍāyatana	Twelve Nidānas; Sparśa	Succeeded by Vedanā
