= Cetanā =

Buddhist concept regarding intention

Translations of Cetanā
- English: volition, intention, directionality of mind, attraction, urge
- Sanskrit: चेतना (cetanā or chetanā)
- Pali: चेतना (cetanā or chetanā)
- Burmese: စေတနာ
- Chinese: 思
- Indonesian: kehendak, niat
- Khmer: ចេតនា (UNGEGN: chétânéa; ALA-LC: cetanā; IPA: [ceːtanaː])
- Tibetan: སེམས་པ། (Wylie: sems pa; THL: sempa)
- Thai: เจตนา (RTGS: chettana)
- Vietnamese: tư (思) tư tác cố ý

Cetanā (Sanskrit, Pali; Tibetan Wylie: sems pa) is a Buddhist term commonly translated as "volition", "intention", "directionality", etc. It can be defined as a mental factor that moves or urges the mind in a particular direction, toward a specific object or goal. Cetanā is identified within the Buddhist teachings as follows:

- One of the seven universal mental factors in the Theravada Abhidharma.
- One of the Ten mahā-bhūmika in Sarvastivada Abhidharma.
- One of the five universal mental factors in the Mahayana Abhidharma
- The most significant mental factor involved in the creation of karma.

== Definitions ==
=== Theravada ===
Bhikkhu Bodhi states:

Cetana...is the mental factor that is concerned with the actualization of a goal, that is, the conative or volitional aspect of cognition. Thus it is rendered volition. The Commentaries explain that cetana organizes its associated mental factors in acting upon the object. Its characteristic is the state of willing, its function is to accumulate (kamma), and its manifestation is coordination. Its proximate cause is the associated states. Just as a chief pupil recites his own lesson and also makes the other pupils recite their own lessons, so when volition starts to work on its object, it sets the associated states to do their tasks as well. Volition is the most significant mental factor in generating kamma, since it is volition that determines the ethical quality of the action.

The Atthasālinī (I, Part IV, Chapter I, 111) states that cetanā has the characteristic of coordinating the associated dhammas (citta and the other cetasikas) on the object and that its function is 'willing'. We read:

...There is no such thing as volition in the four planes of existence without the characteristic of coordinating; all volition has it. But the function of 'willing' is only in moral (kusala) and immoral (akusala) states...It has directing as manifestation. It arises directing associated states, like the chief disciple, the chief carpenter, etc. who fulfil their own and others' duties.

=== Mahayana ===
Geshe Tashi Tsering states:

Intention [...] is also called volition. This is the element that coordinates and directs the activity of each of the other elements within the main mind in respect to the object. Once feeling is present, intention moves our mind in a certain direction.
Intention is the factor that actualizes what feeling has initiated. If the feeling generated upon contact with an object is attraction, intention moves the mind forward toward the object. For example, I smell a ripe mango in a shop I am passing, and the feeling of attraction arises. Intention is the shift in the mental process toward buying it.

The Abhidharma-samuccaya states:

What is cetanā? It is a mental activity that propels the mind forward. It has the function of making the mind settle on what is positive, negative, or indeterminate.

Herbert Guenther explains:

It is a mental event that arouses and urges the mind with its corresponding events on towards an object. From among all mental events, it is said to be the most important because the force of this mental event sets the mind and any mental event on to the object. Just as iron cannot but be attracted by a magnet, so also the mind cannot be but set on an object by this mental event.

Alexander Berzin states:

An urge (sems-pa) causes the mental activity to face an object or to go in its direction. In general, it moves a mental continuum to cognitively take an object. A mental continuum (sems-rgyud, mind-stream) is an individual everlasting sequence of moments of mental activity.

Mipham Rinpoche states:

Cetana describes the process of mind [attention] moving towards and becoming involved with an object. In terms of support, there are six, such as cetana upon meeting of the eye [i.e. between object, sense faculty and consciousness], and so forth.

Cetanā operates with six supports, or along six channels:

1. Cetanā occurring in visual situations
2. Cetanā occurring in auditory situations
3. Cetanā occurring in olfactory situations
4. Cetanā occurring in gustatory situations
5. Cetanā occurring in tactile situations
6. Cetanā occurring in thought situations

== Relation to karma ==
In the Buddhist tradition, cetana is considered the most important mental factor in the generation of karma.

Bhikkhu Bodhi states (from the Theravada point of view):

Volition is the most significant mental factor in generating kamma, since it is volition that determines the ethical quality of the action.

Alexander Berzin explains (from the Mahayana point of view):

[According to Asanga's] view, karma (Tibetan: las) is a mental impulse. It is synonymous with the mental factor of an urge (Tibetan: sems-pa). An urge is a mental factor that accompanies every moment of our experience. It is the mental factor that brings us in the direction of a particular experience, either simply to look at or to listen to something, or, in this case, to do something with or to it, to say it, or to think it. Whether it is physical, verbal, or mental karma, the karmic impulse is the mental factor of an urge to do, say, or think something. It is like the impulse to hit someone, to tell the truth, or to think longing thoughts about a loved one. It is also the mental urge to continue doing, saying, or thinking something, as well as the mental urge to stop engaging in them and to do, say, or think about something else. Usually, we are not at all aware of these mental urges or impulses. In Western terminology, we would say they are usually "unconscious."

== Alternate translations ==
- Attraction (Erik Pema Kunsang)
- Directionality of mind (Herbert Guenther)
- Urge (Alexander Berzin)
- Volition (Bhikkhu Bodhi)

== See also ==
- Karma in Buddhism
- Manasikāra
- Mental factors (Buddhism)

== Sources ==
- Berzin, Alexander (2006), Primary Minds and the 51 Mental Factors
- Berzin, Alexander (2008), Clearing Away Extraneous Conceptions about Karma
- Bhikkhu Bodhi (2003), A Comprehensive Manual of Abhidhamma, Pariyatti Publishing
- Geshe Tashi Tsering (2006), Buddhist Psychology: The Foundation of Buddhist Thought, Volume III, Perseus Books Group, Kindle Edition
- Guenther, Herbert V. & Leslie S. Kawamura (1975), Mind in Buddhist Psychology: A Translation of Ye-shes rgyal-mtshan's "The Necklace of Clear Understanding" Dharma Publishing. Kindle Edition.
- Kunsang, Erik Pema (translator) (2004). Gateway to Knowledge, Vol. 1. North Atlantic Books.
- Nina van Gorkom (2010), Cetasikas, Zolag
