= Appamāda =

Buddhist concept

Translations of Appamāda
- English: carefulness, concern, conscientiousness, conscious awareness
- Sanskrit: अप्रमाद - apramāda
- Pali: appamāda
- Chinese: 不放逸(T) / 不放逸(S)
- Korean: 불방일 (RR: bulbangil)
- Tibetan: བག་ཡོད་པ། (Wylie: bag yod pa; THL: bakyö pa)
- Vietnamese: bất phóng dật không dễ duôi

Appamāda (Pali: appamāda; Sanskrit: apramāda; Tibetan Wylie: bag yod pa) is a Buddhist term denoting the quality of not being negligent and of remaining continuously mindful. It occupies a prominent place in the Pāli Canon and its commentaries, while in Mahayana Abhidharma teachings its Sanskrit counterpart, apramāda, is listed as one of the eleven virtuous mental factors and defined as taking great care concerning what should be adopted and what should be avoided.

== Etymology ==
Appamāda is a negation of pamāda, which means 'negligent' or 'lax'. It therefore means 'non-negligence' or 'non-laxity'. The Pali Text Society's Pali-English Dictionary lists a range of renderings, each of which captures only part of the sense, among them 'thoughtfulness', 'carefulness', 'conscientiousness', 'watchfulness', 'vigilance', 'earnestness' and 'zeal'. No single English word captures the essence of the term. (Note: Soma Thera settled on 'earnestness' while explaining the sense of the term at length (Soma Thera 1998, Translator's Introduction).)

== Theravāda Buddhism ==
=== In the Suttas ===
==== Dhammapada ====
The second chapter of the Dhammapada, a part of the Khuddaka Nikāya, is devoted entirely to the term and is named the Appamādavagga. Its opening verse, Dhp 21, states that appamāda is the path to the Deathless while pamāda is the path to death, and that the negligent are as though already dead. (Note: The Pali of the verse reads appamādo amatapadaṃ, pamādo maccuno padaṃ; appamattā na mīyanti, ye pamattā yathā matā.)

==== Saṃyutta Nikāya and Aṅguttara Nikāya ====
A number of discourses place appamāda foremost among wholesome states (kusala). A series in the Maggasaṃyutta of the Saṃyutta Nikāya, and the Appamāda Sutta of the Aṅguttara Nikāya, use the simile that just as the footprints of all legged creatures fit within the footprint of the elephant, and the elephant's footprint is reckoned foremost among them in size, so too all wholesome states are rooted in appamāda, converge upon appamāda, and appamāda is reckoned foremost among them. (Note: The same simile, together with that of the great rivers flowing to the ocean, also appears at AN 10.15. Soma Thera quotes the elephant's footprint simile in his introduction (Soma Thera 1998, Translator's Introduction).)

==== Dīgha Nikāya ====
The term also closes the Buddha's life. According to the Mahāparinibbāna Sutta (DN 16), the last words he spoke before parinibbāna were "vayadhammā saṅkhārā, appamādena sampādetha", that all formations are subject to decay and that one should strive with appamāda. Soma Thera holds that everything the Buddha taught from his awakening to his passing is summed up in that final exhortation, and that appamāda runs through the whole of the Buddha's word.

=== Commentarial explanation ===
In the Theravāda tradition the technical sense of appamāda is fixed by the commentaries. The Sumaṅgalavilāsinī, the commentary on the Dīgha Nikāya, glosses the term as appamādo vuccati satiyā avippavāso, the non-absence of sati or mindfulness. The same gloss appears in the Dhammapada-aṭṭhakathā. Nyanatiloka notes that this explanation, appamāda as the presence of sati, is common throughout the commentarial literature.

Soma Thera describes appamāda as sati accompanied by sustained viriya (energy, diligence, enthusiasm, effort), functioning thereby as a spiritual power and destroying the wavering of pamāda. He states that in meaning it is the non-neglect of sati, and that the term denotes mindfulness that is always active and constantly at work. (Note: Soma Thera also records an alternative explanation offered by some, namely that appamāda is the four mental aggregates (feeling, perception, consciousness and formations) proceeding with the application of sati and [[Sampajañña|sampajañña]] (satisampajaññayogena pavattā cattāro arūpino khandhā appamādo); see Soma Thera 1998, Translator's Introduction.)

=== In the Abhidhamma ===
Unlike the Mahāyāna Abhidharma, which lists apramāda as a distinct mental factor, the list of fifty-two cetasika in the Theravāda Abhidhamma does not include appamāda as a factor in its own right, consistent with the commentarial explanation of it in terms of sati.

== Mahāyāna Buddhism ==
The Buddhist text Abhidharma-samuccaya states the following:

What is concern? From taking its stand on non-attachment (alobha), non-hatred (adveṣa), and non-deludedness (amoha) coupled with diligence (vīrya), it considers whatever is positive and protects the mind against things which cannot satisfy. Its function is to make complete and to realize all worldly and transworldly excellences.

The scholar Alexander Berzin comments on carefulness:

A caring attitude (bag-yod, carefulness) is a subsidiary awareness that, while remaining in a state of detachment, imperturbability, lack of naivety, and joyful perseverance, causes us to meditate on constructive things and safeguards against leaning toward tainted (negative) things. In other words, being disgusted with and not longing for compulsive existence, not wanting to cause harm in response to its suffering, not being naive about the effects of our behavior, and taking joy in acting constructively, a caring attitude brings us to act constructively and to refrain from destructive behavior. This is because we care about the situations of others and ourselves and about the effects of our actions on both; we take them seriously.

The scholar Robert Thurman emphasizes the high degree of apramāda of a person who has realized emptiness:

This denotes a type of awareness of the most seemingly insignificant aspects of daily life, an awareness derived as a consequence of the highest realization of the ultimate nature of reality. As it is stated in the Anavataptaparipṛcchasutra: "He who realizes voidness, that person is consciously aware." "Ultimate realization," far from obliterating the relative world, brings it into highly specific, albeit dreamlike, focus.

The term is described at length in the fourth chapter of the Buddhist text Bodhicharyavatara.

== Alternate translations ==
- Heedfulness, often used in Theravāda sources
- Earnestness (Soma Thera)
- Carefulness (Alexander Berzin)
- A caring attitude (Alexander Berzin)
- Conscious awareness (Robert Thurman)
- Concern (Herbert Guenther)
- Conscientiousness
- Diligence

== See also ==
- Sati (Buddhism)
- Sampajañña
- Mental factors
- Buddhist meditation
