= Manasikāra =

Concept in Buddhism

Translations of manasikara
- English: attention, mental advertence, 'taking on an object, making something one's rest or issue'
- Sanskrit: मनसिकार, manasikāra
- Pali: manasikāra
- Burmese: မနသိကာရ
- Chinese: 作意 (T) / 作意 (S)
- Indonesian: perhatian, atensi
- Japanese: 作意 (Rōmaji: sai)
- Korean: 작의 (RR: jakeui)
- Tibetan: ཡིད་བྱེད (Wylie: yid byed; THL: yi jé)
- Thai: มนสิการ (RTGS: manasikan)
- Vietnamese: tác ý

Manasikara (Sanskrit and Pali, also manasikāra; Tibetan Wylie: yid la byed pa or yid byed) is a Buddhist term that is translated as "attention" or "mental advertence". It is defined as the process of the mind fixating upon an object. Manasikara is identified within the Buddhist Abhidharma teachings as follows:

- One of the seven universal mental factors in the Theravada Abhidharma.
- One of the five universal mental factors in the Mahayana Abhidharma

== Definitions ==
=== Theravada ===
Bhikkhu Bodhi states:

The Pali word literally means “making in the mind.” Attention is the mental factor responsible for the mind’s advertence to the object, by virtue of which the object is made present to consciousness. Its characteristic is the conducting (sāraṇa) of the associated mental states towards the object. Its function is to yoke the associated states to the object. It is manifested as confrontation with an object, and its proximate cause is the object. Attention is like the rudder of a ship, which directs it to its destination, or like a charioteer who sends the well-trained horses (i.e. the associated states) towards their destination (the object). Manasikāra should be distinguished from vitakka: while the former turns its concomitants towards the object, the latter applies them onto the object. Manasikāra is an indispensable cognitive factor present in all states of consciousness; vitakka is a specialized factor which is not indispensable to cognition.

The Atthasālinī (I, Part IV, Chapter 1, 133) and the Visuddhimagga (XIV, 152) define manasikāra as follows:

...It has the characteristic of driving associated states towards the object, the function of joining (yoking) associated states to the object, the manifestation of facing the object. It is included in the saṅkhārakkhandha, and should be regarded as the charioteer of associated states because it regulates the object.

=== Mahayana ===
The Abhidharma-samuccaya states:

What is manasikara? It is a continuity having the function of holding the mind to what has become its reference.

Herbert Guenther states:

It is a cognition that keeps the complex of mind in its specific objective reference.

The difference between cetanā and manasikara is that cetanā brings the mind towards the object in a general move, while manasikara makes the mind fixate upon this particular objective reference.

== See also ==
- Mental factors (Buddhism)

== Sources ==
- Bhikkhu Bodhi (2012), A Comprehensive Manual of Abhidhamma: The Abhidhammattha Sangaha (Vipassana Meditation and the Buddha's Teachings), Independent Publishers Group Kindle Edition
- Guenther, Herbert V. & Leslie S. Kawamura (1975), Mind in Buddhist Psychology: A Translation of Ye-shes rgyal-mtshan's "The Necklace of Clear Understanding" Dharma Publishing. Kindle Edition.
- Kunsang, Erik Pema (translator) (2004). Gateway to Knowledge, Vol. 1. North Atlantic Books.
- Nina van Gorkom (2010), Cetasikas, Zolag
