= Muṣitasmṛtitā =

Buddhist term translated as "forgetfulness"

Translations of Muṣitasmṛtitā
- English: forgetfulness
- Sanskrit: Muṣitasmṛtitā
- Chinese: 失念, 忘念
- Korean: 실념, 망념 (RR: silneoym, mangneoym)
- Tibetan: བརྗེད་ངས། (Wylie: brjed ngas; THL: jengé)

Muṣitasmṛtitā (Sanskrit; Tibetan phonetic: jengé) is a Buddhist term that is translated as "forgetfulness". In the Mahayana tradition, muṣitasmṛtitā is defined as forgetting or losing our focus on a virtuous object and instead focusing on an object or situation that causes non-virtuous thoughts or emotions to arise.

Muṣitasmṛtitā is identified as:

- One of the twenty secondary unwholesome factors within the Mahayana Abhidharma teachings

== Definitions ==
Mipham Rinpoche states:

Forgetfullness [muṣitasmṛtitā] is to be unclear and forget a virtuous object. It is the erroneous mindfulness that accompanies a disturbing emotion, and it is the opposite of being mindful. It forms the support for distraction of mind.

The Abhidharma-samuccaya states:

What is forgetfulness? It is fleeting inspection which is simultaneous with and on the same level as the emotions. It functions as the basis of distraction.

Alexander Berzin explains:

Forgetfulness (brjed-nges). Based on recollection of something toward which we have a disturbing emotion or attitude, forgetfulness is losing our object of focus so that it will wander to that disturbing object. Forgetfulness serves as the basis for mental wandering (rnam-par g.yeng-ba).

== See also ==
- Kleshas (Buddhism)
- Mental factors (Buddhism)

== Sources ==
- Berzin, Alexander (2006), Primary Minds and the 51 Mental Factors
- Guenther, Herbert V. & Leslie S. Kawamura (1975), Mind in Buddhist Psychology: A Translation of Ye-shes rgyal-mtshan's "The Necklace of Clear Understanding" Dharma Publishing. Kindle Edition.
- Kunsang, Erik Pema (translator) (2004). Gateway to Knowledge, Vol. 1. North Atlantic Books.
- Nina van Gorkom (2010), Cetasikas, London: Zolag
