= Adhimokṣa =

Buddhist term

Translations of Adhimoksha
- English: interest, intensified interest, decision, firm conviction
- Sanskrit: adhimoksha, adhimokṣa
- Pali: adhimokkha
- Chinese: 勝解
- Indonesian: keputusan
- Tibetan: མོས་པ། (Wylie: mos pa; THL: möpa)
- Thai: อธิโมกข (RTGS: athimokkha)
- Vietnamese: thắng giải

Adhimoksha (Sanskrit, also adhimokṣa; Pali: adhimokkha; Tibetan Wylie: mos pa) is a Buddhist term that is translated as "interest", "intensified interest", or "decision". It is defined as holding onto a certain form object; its function is not to lose the object.

Within the Buddhist Abhidharma teachings, adhimokṣa is identified as follows:

- One of the six occasional mental factors within the Theravāda Abhidharma teachings
- One of the five object-determining mental factors within the Mahāyāna Abhidharma teachings

== Explanation ==
=== Theravāda ===
The Visuddhimagga ( XIV, 151) gives the following definition of adhimokkha:

The act of resolving is resolution. It has the characteristic of conviction. Its function is not to grope. It is manifested as decisiveness. Its proximate cause is a thing to be convinced about. It should be regarded as like a boundary-post owing to its immovableness with regard to the object.

Bhikkhu Bodhi explains:

The word adhimokkha means literally the releasing of the mind onto the object. Hence it has been rendered decision or resolution. It has the characteristic of conviction, the function of not groping, and manifestation as decisiveness. Its proximate cause is a thing to be convinced about. It is compared to a stone pillar owing to its unshakable resolve regarding the object.

=== Mahayana ===
The Abhidharma-samuccaya states:

What is intensified interest? It is to stick to the determined thing just as it has been determined, and the function of intensified interest is that it cannot be taken away.

Herbert Guenther states:

It is an awareness by which one stays with what the mind [yul-can] has logically established as this is so and not otherwise.

== See also ==
- Mental factors (Buddhism)

== Sources ==
- Berzin, Alexander (2006), Primary Minds and the 51 Mental Factors
- Bhikkhu Bodhi (2003), A Comprehensive Manual of Abhidhamma, Pariyatti Publishing
- Guenther, Herbert V. & Leslie S. Kawamura (1975), Mind in Buddhist Psychology: A Translation of Ye-shes rgyal-mtshan's "The Necklace of Clear Understanding" Dharma Publishing. Kindle Edition.
- Kunsang, Erik Pema (translator) (2004). Gateway to Knowledge, Vol. 1. North Atlantic Books.
- Nina van Gorkom (2010), Cetasikas, Zolag
