= Saṃjñā =

Buddhist term

Translations of Saṃjñā
- English: perception, cognition, conceptualization, distinguishing
- Sanskrit: saṃjñā, संज्ञा
- Pali: saññā, सञ्ञा
- Burmese: သညက္ခန္ဓာ, ဆန္ဒ
- Chinese: 想 (xiǎng)
- Indonesian: persepsi
- Japanese: 想 (Rōmaji: sō)
- Khmer: សញ្ញា (UNGEGN: sânhnhéa)
- Korean: 상 (RR: sang)
- Tibetan: འདུ་ཤེས། (Wylie: 'du shes; THL: du shé)
- Thai: สัญญา (RTGS: sanya)
- Vietnamese: Tưởng

Uses of samādhi (based on AN IV.41)
object of concentration	development
four jhānas	pleasant abiding (sukha-vihārāya) in this life (diţţhadhamma)
perception (sañña) of light (āloka)	knowing (ñāṇa) and seeing (dassana)
arising, passing, fading of feelings (vedanā), perceptions (saññā) and thoughts (vitakkā)	mindfulness (sati) and clear comprehension (sampajaññā)
arising and fading of the five aggregates of clinging (pañc'upādāna-khandha)	extinction (khaya) of the taints (āsava) [Arahantship]

Saṃjñā (Sanskrit; Pali: saññā) is a Buddhist term that is typically translated as "perception" or "cognition." It can be defined as grasping at distinguishing features or characteristics. Samjñā has multiple meanings depending on religions. Although Samjñā means the five aggregates in Buddhism, in Hinduism, it refers to art traditions and in Jainism, it points to recognition distinct from cognition.

Saṃjñā is identified within the Buddhist teachings as follows:

- One of the five aggregates
- One of the seven universal mental factors in the Theravada Abhidharma.
- One of the five universal mental factors in the Mahayana Abhidharma

== Definitions ==
=== Theravada ===
Bhikkhu Bodhi states:

The characteristic of perception is the perceiving of the qualities of the object. Its function is to make a sign as a condition for perceiving again that "this is the same," or its function is recognizing what has been previously perceived. It becomes manifest as the interpreting of the object...by way of the features that had been apprehended. Its proximate cause is the object as it appears. Its procedure is compared to a carpenter's recognition of certain kinds of wood by the mark he has made on each.

According to the Theravada tradition, saññā experiences the same object as the citta it accompanies but it performs its own task: it 'perceives' or 'recognizes' the object and it 'marks' it so that it can be recognized again.

The Atthasālinī (I, Part IV, Chapter 1, 110) provides the following two definitions for saññā:

- ...It has the characteristic of noting and the function of recognizing what has been previously noted. There is no such thing as perception in the four planes of existence without the characteristic of noting. All perceptions have the characteristic of noting. Of them, that perceiving which knows by specialized knowledge has the function of recognizing what has been noted previously. We may see this procedure when the carpenter recognizes a piece of wood which he has marked by specialized knowledge...
- Perception has the characteristic of perceiving by an act of general inclusion, and the function of making marks as a condition for repeated perception (for recognizing or remembering), as when woodcutters 'perceive' logs and so forth. Its manifestation is the action of interpreting by means of the sign as apprehended, as in the case of blind persons who 'see' an elephant. Or, it has briefness as manifestation, like lightning, owing to its inability to penetrate the object. Its proximate cause is whatever object has appeared, like the perception which arises in young deer mistaking scarecrows for men.

=== Mahayana ===
The Abhidharma-samuccaya states:

What is the absolutely specific characteristic of conceptualization (saṃjñā)? It is to know by association. It is to see, hear, specify, and to know by way of taking up the defining characteristics and distinguishing them.

Mipham Rinpoche states:

Perception consists of the grasping of distinguishing features.

In terms of support, they can be divided into six types: perceptions resulting from contact, the meeting of the eye and so forth, up until the mind.

Furthermore, they are distinguishing characteristics in regard to sense objects... and... in regard to names...

Alexander Berzin gives the following informal explanation:

Then there is distinguishing (’du-shes, Skt. samjna). And so it takes a special feature of the object, of the appearing object—so, the hologram—and it gives some significance to it, some conventional significance to it. In other words, within a sense field it distinguishes between, for instance, light and dark. I mean, we’re seeing a huge amount of information, and in order to deal with it we need to distinguish one little piece from everything else. That’s distinguishing.

== Within the five aggregates ==
Saṃjñā is identified as one of the five aggregates, as shown in the following diagram:

The Five Aggregates (pañcakkhandha)
according to the Pali Canon.

form (rūpa)
4 elements (mahābhūta)
	↓
	contact (phassa)
↓	↑
consciousness (viññāna)

→
←

←

mental factors (cetasika)
feeling (vedanā)
perception (sañña)
formation (saṅkhāra)

- Form is derived from the Four Great Elements.
- Consciousness arises from other aggregates.
- Mental Factors arise from the Contact of
  Consciousness and other aggregates.
- The five aggregates are no-self.

Source: MN 109 (Thanissaro, 2001) | diagram details

== In the early Buddhist literature ==
In the early Buddhism Theravadin texts of the Nikāyas and Āgamas, saṃjñā/sañña is the third of the five aggregates (Skt.: skandha; Pali: khandha) which can be used to skillfully delineate phenomenological experiences during meditation. Whether as one of the Five Aggregates, meditative concentration (samādhi) on the passing and rising (P. vipassana, S. vipaśyanā) of sañña can lead to mindfulness (P.sati, S. smṛti), clear comprehension (P. sampajanna, S. samprajaña) enlightenment and Arhantship (see Table).

In the Pali Canon, sañña is frequently defined as:

It perceives blue, it perceives yellow, it perceives red, it perceives white.

In post-canonical Pali commentaries, the Visuddhimagga likens sañña to "a child without discretion."
