= Asaṃprajanya =

Translations of Asaṃprajanya
- English: Inattentiveness, inattention, non-alertness, being unalert, non-vigilance
- Sanskrit: असंप्रजन्य (Asaṃprajanya)
- Chinese: 不正知
- Tibetan: ཤེས་བཞིན་མིན་པ། (Wylie: shes bzhin min pa; THL: sheshyin minpa)

Asaṃprajanya (Sanskrit; Tibetan phonetic: sheshyin minpa) is a Buddhist term that is translated as "inattentiveness", "non-alertness", etc. In the Mahayana tradition, asaṃprajanya is defined the distracted discrimination accompanying a disturbing emotion.

Asaṃprajanya is identified as:

- One of the twenty secondary unwholesome factors within the Mahayana Abhidharma teachings
- The opposite of samprajanya (alertness, attentiveness, vigilance)

== Definitions ==
Mipham Rinpoche states:

Non-alertness [inattention] is the distracted discrimination accompanying a disturbing emotion. It results in a hasty and mindless engagement in the actions of the three doors without alertness, and so forms the support for downfalls to occur.

The Abhidharma-samuccaya states:

What is inattentiveness? It is it discriminating awareness which is simultaneous with and on the same level as the emotions and thereby is made inattentive regarding actions by body, speech, and mind. It has the function of providing a basis for falling from one's level of being.

Alexander Berzin explains:

Being unalert (shes-bzhin ma-yin-pa) is a disturbing, deluded discriminating awareness associated with longing desire (raga), hostility (dvesha), or naivety (moha), that causes us to enter into improper physical, verbal, or mental activity without knowing correctly what is proper or improper. Thus, we do not take steps to correct or prevent our improper behavior.

The significance of this mental factor is noted in the following verse from the Bodhicaryavatara (Chapter V, verse 26):

A person who is learned and has trust
But does not apply himself diligently
Will be sullied by falling from his status
Because the defect of not being watchful has clung to him.

== See also ==
- Kleshas (Buddhism)
- Mental factors (Buddhism)
- Samprajanya

== Sources ==
- Berzin, Alexander (2006), Primary Minds and the 51 Mental Factors
- Guenther, Herbert V. & Leslie S. Kawamura (1975), Mind in Buddhist Psychology: A Translation of Ye-shes rgyal-mtshan's "The Necklace of Clear Understanding" Dharma Publishing. Kindle Edition.
- Kunsang, Erik Pema (translator) (2004). Gateway to Knowledge, Vol. 1. North Atlantic Books.
- Nina van Gorkom (2010). Cetasikas, London: Zolag
