= Lobha =

Hindu and Buddhist concept of character affliction

Translations of Lobha
- English: "lust," "desire," "craving," "greed"
- Vietnamese: Tham

Lobha is a Sanskrit and Pali word—often translated as "lust," "desire," "craving," "greed"—which has different meanings depending on the context.

In Hinduism, lobha (Sanskrit: लोभ) (Burmese: လောဘ) is the concept of character affliction that refers to any form of "sensuality, lust, desire" or "attachment to sensual objects". It is one of the five kleshas that afflict the Ātman. It is one of the Shadripurs.

In Buddhism, lobha (Pāli), closely related to taṇhā and rāga, refers to the concept of "craving" or "greed" that is a mental factor in the form of mental defilement, acting as one of the roots of evil actions—lobha, dosa, and moha.

Lobha is a Sanskrit technical term, used in jurisdiction, meaning "greed for wealth". It has been cited as one of the causes of perjury.

Alobha (Sanskrit, Pali; Tibetan Wylie: ma chags pa) is a Buddhist term translated as "non-attachment" or "non-greed". It is defined as the absence of attachment or desire towards worldly things or worldly existence. It causes one to not engage in unwholesome actions. It is one of the virtuous mental factors within the Abhidharma teachings.

The Abhidharma-samuccaya states:

What is alobha? It is not to be attached to a mode of life and all that is involved with it. It functions in providing the basis for not being caught up in non-virtuous action.

== In Hinduism ==
The word lobha is used in religious literature such as the Manusmriti. Lobha refers to material greed. According to the Vishnu Purana, lobha represents a type of spiritual pain of the emotional kind. According to Vishnu Purana verses 6.5.1-6, "the wise man investigates the three types of worldly suffering, or mental and physical suffering and the like, and attains true knowledge and detachment from human objects, attaining ultimate extinction". Ramayana advises forest dwellers to give up lobha in verse 2.24.

The Bhagavad Gita identifies greed, alongside desire and anger, as one of the three gates to hell that destroy the soul (verse 16.21), urging their renunciation. In verse 14.17, greed is identified as rooted in the rajas and associated with restlessness and attachment, contrasting with sattva, which fosters wisdom.

== See also ==
- Mohā
