= Krodha (Mental factor) =

Translations of krodha
- English: fury rage indigation
- Sanskrit: krodha
- Chinese: 忿
- Japanese: 忿 (Rōmaji: fun)
- Khmer: ក្រោធ (UNGEGN: Krout)
- Tibetan: ཁྲོ་བ་ (Wylie: khro ba; THL: khroba)

Krodha (Sanskrit: क्रोध; Tibetan Wylie: khro ba) is a Dharmic term in Buddhism and Hinduism that is translated as "fury", "rage", or "indignation". Within the Mahayana Abhidharma tradition, krodha is identified as one of the twenty subsidiary unwholesome mental factors. It is defined as an increase of anger (Sanskrit: pratigha) that causes one to prepare to harm others.

According to Herber Guenther, the difference between anger (pratigha) and fury (krodha) is that anger is a vindictive or hostile attitude in one's mind, but fury is an increase in anger when the chance for harming is at hand and is it very agitated state of mind leading to actual physical harm.

Alexander Berzin states:

Hatred (khro-ba) is a part of hostility (dvesha) and is the harsh intention to cause harm.

Note that according to Berzin, dvesha is a sub-category of anger (pratigha).

== See also ==
- Kleshas (Buddhism)
- Mental factors (Buddhism)
- Wrathful deities

Hinduism

- Arishadvargas, six enemies
- Akrodha (Hinduism)

== Sources ==
- Berzin, Alexander (2006), Primary Minds and the 51 Mental Factors
- Goleman, Daniel (2008). Destructive Emotions: A Scientific Dialogue with the Dalai Lama. Bantam. Kindle Edition.
- Guenther, Herbert V. & Leslie S. Kawamura (1975), Mind in Buddhist Psychology: A Translation of Ye-shes rgyal-mtshan's "The Necklace of Clear Understanding" Dharma Publishing. Kindle Edition.
- Kunsang, Erik Pema (translator) (2004). Gateway to Knowledge, Vol. 1. North Atlantic Books.
