= Upanāha =

Translations of Upanāha
- English: resentment, enmity, vindictiveness
- Sanskrit: upanāha
- Chinese: 恨
- Tibetan: འཁོན་དུ་འཛིན་པ། (Wylie: 'khon du 'dzin pa; THL: khön du dzinpa)

Upanāha (Sanskrit; Tibetan phonetic: khön du dzinpa) is a Buddhist term translated as "resentment" or "enmity". It is defined as clinging to an intention to cause harm, and withholding forgiveness. It is one of the twenty subsidiary unwholesome mental factors within the Mahayana Abhidharma teachings.

The Abhidharma-samuccaya states:

What is resentment? It is not letting go of an obsession which develops through association with the anger which underlies it. Its function is to be the basis of non-endurance.

Alan Wallace described upanāha as "a lingering holding of anger (Sanskrit: krodha)".

== See also ==
- Mental factors (Buddhism)

== Sources ==
- Goleman, Daniel (2008), Destructive Emotions: A Scientific Dialogue with the Dalai Lama, Bantam, Kindle Edition
- Guenther, Herbert V. (1975), Mind in Buddhist Psychology: A Translation of Ye-shes rgyal-mtshan's "The Necklace of Clear Understanding", Dharma Publishing, Kindle Edition
- Kunsang, Erik Pema (2004), Gateway to Knowledge, Vol. 1, North Atlantic Books
