= Ujukatā =

Buddhist term

Translations of Ujukatā
- English: rectitude, straightness, uprightness
- Pali: ujukatā
- Indonesian: kejujuran

Ujukatā (Pali) is a Buddhist term translated as "rectitude", and it is the basis for the following pair of mental factors within the Theravada Abhidharma teachings:

- Kāya-ujukatā – rectitude of mental body
- Citta-ujukatā – rectitude of consciousness

These two mental factors have the characteristic of uprightness of the mental body and consciousness, respectively.

== Definition ==
Bhikkhu Bodhi states:

Rectitude is straightness. The twofold rectitude has the characteristic of uprightness of the mental body and consciousness, respectively. Its function is to crush tortuousness of the mental body and consciousness, and its manifestation is non-crookedness. Its proximate cause is the mental body and consciousness. It should be regarded as opposed to hypocrisy and fraudulence, etc., which create crookedness in the mental body and consciousness.

Nina van Gorkom said:

According to the Dhammasangani (par 50, 50), this pair of cetasikas consists in straightness and rectitude, being without deflection, twist or crookedness.
The Atthasālinī (I, Book I, Part IV, Chapter I, 131) explains that uprightness of cetasikas and of citta crush crookedness and that they are the opponents of the corruptions, such as deception and craftiness, which cause crookedness in mental factors and consciousness.
Uprightness is the opponent of deception and craftiness.

== See also ==
- Mental factors (Buddhism)
- Samadhi (Buddhism)

== Sources ==
- Bhikkhu Bodhi (2012), A Comprehensive Manual of Abhidhamma: The Abhidhammattha Sangaha (Vipassana Meditation and the Buddha's Teachings), Independent Publishers Group Kindle Edition
- van Gorkom, Nina (2010), Cetasikas, Zolag
