= Mental factors =

Buddhist aspects of the mind

Translations of Mental factors
- English: mental factors mental events mental states
- Sanskrit: चैतसिक, चैतिक, चैत्त caitasika, caitika, caitta
- Pali: चेतसिक cetasika
- Burmese: စိတ်, စိတ်စေတသိက်
- Chinese: 心所(法)
- Indonesian: faktor mental cetasika
- Japanese: 心所 (Rōmaji: shinjo)
- Korean: 심소, 심소법, 마음작용 (RR: simso, simsobeob, maeumjakyong)
- Tagalog: Kaitasika
- Tibetan: སེམས་བྱུང་ (Wylie: sems byung; THL: semjung)
- Thai: เจตสิก (RTGS: chettasik)
- Vietnamese: tâm sở, sở hữu tâm, tánh

Mental factors (Sanskrit: चैतसिक, romanized: caitasika or chitta samskara चित्त संस्कार; Pali: cetasika; Tibetan: སེམས་བྱུང sems byung), in Buddhism, are identified within the teachings of the Abhidhamma (Buddhist psychology). They are defined as aspects of the mind that apprehend the quality of an object, and that have the ability to color the mind. Within the Abhidhamma, the mental factors are categorized as formations (Sanskrit: samskara) concurrent with mind (Sanskrit: citta). Alternate translations for mental factors include "mental states", "mental events", and "concomitants of consciousness".

== Introduction ==
Mental factors are aspects of the mind that apprehend the quality of an object and have the ability to color the mind. Geshe Tashi Tsering explains:

The Tibetan for mental factors, semlay jungwa chö (Skt. chaitasika dharma), means phenomena arising from the mind, suggesting that the mental factors are not primary to the mind but arise within a larger framework. A mental factor, again, is defined as the aspect of the mind that apprehends a particular quality of an object. Because it is characterized by the qualities of activity and non-neutrality, it has the ability to color the mind in dependence on the way it manifests. Hence, a feeling of desire from seeing what is conceived as a beautiful object affects the other mental factors that are present at that time, and this colors the whole mind.

The relationship between the main mind (Sanskrit: citta) and the mental factors can be described by the following metaphors:

- The main mind is like screen in a cinema, and the mental factors are like the images projected on the screen. In this analogy, we typically do not notice the screen because we are so caught up on the images.
- The main mind is like a king who sits passively on a throne, and the mental factors are like the king's busy ministers.

Traleg Rinpoche states that the main distinction between the mind and mental factors is that the mind apprehends an object as a whole, whereas mental factors apprehend an object in its particulars. (Note: Traleg Rinpoche states: "The fundamental distinction made in Yogacara philosophy between the mind and mental events is that the mind apprehends an object as a whole, whereas mental events apprehend an object in its particulars. If we perceive a table, then the perception of the table itself would be related to the mind, whereas the particular characteristics of that table would be the object of perception for the mental events. First, we have an immediate perception of the table. After that, we have certain feeling-tones, certain judgments, involved with that particular perception. Those things are related to the mental events. The immediate perception is the only thing related to the mind. That seems to be the major distinction between the mind and the mental events.")

== Lists of mental factors ==
Within Buddhism, there are many different systems of abhidharma (commonly referred to as Buddhist psychology), and each system contains its own list of the most significant mental factors. (Note: Alexander Berzin states: "There are many different systems of abhidharma (chos-mngon-pa, topics of knowledge), each with its individual count and list of subsidiary awarenesses. Often, the definitions of the awarenesses they assert in common differ as well.") (Note: Bikkhu Bodhi states: "A second distinguishing feature of the Abhidhamma is the dissection of the apparently continuous stream of consciousness into a succession of discrete evanescent cognitive events called cittas, each a complex unity involving consciousness itself, as the basic awareness of an object, and a constellation of mental factors (cetasika) exercising more specialized tasks in the act of cognition. Such a view of consciousness, at least in outline, can readily be derived from the Sutta Pitaka's analysis of experience into the five aggregates, among which the four mental aggregates are always inseparably conjoined, but the conception remains there merely suggestive. In the Abhidhamma Pitaka the suggestion is not simply picked up, but is expanded into an extraordinarily detailed and coherent picture of the functioning of consciousness both in its microscopic immediacy and in its extended continuity from life to life.") These lists vary from system to system both in the number of mental factors listed, and in the definitions that are given for each mental factor.

Some of the main commentaries on the Abhidharma systems that are studied today include:

- Theravāda:
  - Abhidhammattha-sangaha by Acariya Anuruddha – a Theravada commentary that lists fifty-two mental factors.
  - Atthasālinī by Buddhaghosa – a Theravada commentary that provides explanations for fifty-two mental factors.
- Mahāyāna:
  - Abhidharma-samuccaya by Asanga – a Yogachara commentary (studied by the Mahayana schools) that lists fifty-one mental factors.
  - Innermost Core of Topics of Knowledge (mDzod-phug) by Shenrab Miwo – a Tibetan Bon commentary that lists fifty-one factors.
- Sarvāstivāda:
  - Abhidharmakośa by Vasubandhu – a Sarvastivada commentary (studied by the Mahayana schools) that lists forty-two mental factors.

== Sthaviravāda Abhidharma tradition ==
The number of mental factors varies in different Sarvastivada works. The Abhidharmakośa lists 42 mental factors which include:

=== Ten factors arising with every mind (mahābhūmika) ===
- Vedanā – feeling
- Saṃjñā – perception
- Cetanā – volition
- Sparśa – contact
- Chanda – desire (to act)
- Prajñā – wisdom
- Smṛti – mindfulness
- Manasikāra – attention
- Adhimokṣa – decision
- Samādhi – mental concentration (also called ekaggata, one-pointedness)

=== Ten factors arising with every good mind (kuśalamahābhūmikā) ===
- Śraddhā – reasoned trust
- Vīrya – energy
- Hrī – shame at doing evil
- Apatrāpya – decorum, regard for consequence
- Alobha – non-attachment
- Adveṣa – non-aggression
- Praśrabdhi – calmness
- Upekṣā – equanimity
- Appamāda – conscientiousness
- Ahiṃsā – non-injuriousness

=== Six factors arising with every defiled mind (kleśamahābhūmika) ===
- Moha – delusion
- Pramāda – heedlessness, carelessness, unconcern
- Kauśīdya – laziness, slothfulness
- Āśraddhya – lack of reasoned trust
- Styāna – lethargy, gloominess
- Auddhatya – excitement, ebullience

=== Two factors arising with every bad mind (akusalamahābhūmika) ===
- Āhrīkya - shamelessness
- Anapatrapya - disregard

=== Ten factors arising with defiled mind to a limited extent (parittaklesabhūmika) ===
- Krodha - anger
- Mrakśa - hypocrisy
- Mātsarya - selfishness
- Īrṣyā - envy
- Pradāśa - spite
- Vihiṃsā - violence
- Upanāha - vengefulness
- Śāṭhya - deception
- Māyā - deceit
- Mada - pride

=== Four indeterminate factors (aniyatabhūmika) ===
These factors can be associated with good, bad or neutral mind.

- Kaukritya - regret
- Middha - sleepiness
- Vitarka - initial thought
- Vicāra - sustained thought

== Theravāda Abhidhamma tradition ==
Within the Theravāda Abhidhamma tradition, the Abhidhammattha-sangaha enumerates the fifty-two mental factors listed below: (Note: These fifty-two mental states are enumerated and defined in chapter 2 of the Abhidhammattha-sangaha. See: Abhidhammattha-sangaha (Chapter 2) translated by Nārada Thera, et al.; The Abhidhamma in Practice: The Cetasikas)

Relationship between nāmarūpa, pañcakkhandha, and Abhidhamma
Groups			Pañcakkhandha (five aggregates)	Theravada Abhidhamma	
Groups			Pañcakkhandha (five aggregates)	Paramattha-sacca (ultimate reality)	
dhamma	saṅkhāra	nāma (mental)	viññāṇakkhandha (khandha of consciousness)	89/121 citta (consciousness)	81 mundane 8/40 supramundane
dhamma	saṅkhāra	nāma (mental)	vedanākkhandha (khandha of feeling)	52 cetasika (mental factors)	1 vedanācetasika (cetasika of feeling)
dhamma	saṅkhāra	nāma (mental)	saññākkhandha (khandha of perception)	52 cetasika (mental factors)	1 saññācetasika (cetasika of perception)
dhamma	saṅkhāra	nāma (mental)	saṅkhārakkhandha (khandha of formations)	52 cetasika (mental factors)	50 others
dhamma	saṅkhāra	rūpa (form)	rūpakkhandha (khandha of form)	28 rūpa (form)	4 primary elements 24 derived elements
dhamma	-			Nibbāna (Nirvana)	
Notes: The dhamma group consists of saṅkhāra and Nibbāna.; All saṅkhāra are anicca and dukkha.; All dhamma are anattā.; Distinguish between saṅkhāra and saṅkhārakkhandha.

The Five Aggregates (pañcakkhandha)
according to the Pali Canon.

form (rūpa)
4 elements (mahābhūta)
	↓
	contact (phassa)
↓	↑
consciousness (viññāna)

→
←

←

mental factors (cetasika)
feeling (vedanā)
perception (sañña)
formation (saṅkhāra)

- Form is derived from the Four Great Elements.
- Consciousness arises from other aggregates.
- Mental Factors arise from the Contact of
  Consciousness and other aggregates.
- The five aggregates are no-self.

Source: MN 109 (Thanissaro, 2001) | diagram details

=== Seven universal mental factors ===
The seven universal mental factors (sabbacittasādhāraṇa cetasikas) are common (sādhāraṇa) to all consciousness (sabbacitta). Bhikkhu Bodhi states: "These factors perform the most rudimentary and essential cognitive functions, without which consciousness of an object would be utterly impossible."

These seven factors are:

- Phassa – contact
- Vedanā – feeling
- Saññā – perception
- Cetanā – volition
- Ekaggata – one-pointedness (also called samādhi, concentration)
- Jīvitindriya – life faculty
- Manasikāra – attention

=== Six occasional mental factors ===
The six occasional or particular mental factors (pakiṇṇaka cetasikas) are ethically variable mental factors found only in certain consciousnesses. They are:

- Vitakka – Application of thought
- Vicāra – Examining
- Adhimokkha – Decision
- Viriya – Energy
- Pīti – Rapture
- Chanda – Desire (to act)

=== Fourteen unwholesome mental factors ===
The unwholesome mental factors (akusala cetasikas) accompany the unwholesome consciousnesses (akusala citta).

The fourteen unwholesome mental factors are:

- Four universal unwholesome mental factors (akusalasādhāraṇa):
  - Moha – delusion
  - Ahirika – lack of shame
  - Anottappa – disregard for consequence
  - Uddhacca – restlessness
- Three mental factors of the greed-group (lobha):
  - Lobha – greed (also called rāga, greed)
  - Micchādiṭṭhi – wrong view
  - Māna – conceit
- Four mental factors of the hatred-group (dosa)
  - Dosa – hatred
  - Issā – envy
  - Macchariya – miserliness
  - Kukkucca – regret
- Other unwholesome mental factors
  - Thīna – sloth
  - Middha – torpor
  - Vicikicchā – doubt

Bhikkhu Bodhi states:

Unwholesome consciousness (akusalacitta) is consciousness accompanied by one or another of the three unwholesome roots—greed, hatred, and delusion. Such consciousness is called unwholesome because it is mentally unhealthy, morally blameworthy, and productive of painful results.

=== Twenty-five beautiful mental factors ===
The beautiful mental factors (sobhana cetasikas) accompany the wholesome consciousnesses (kusala citta).

The twenty-five beautiful mental factors (sobhana cetasikas) are:

- Nineteen universal beautiful mental factors (sobhanasādhāraṇa):
  - Saddhā – reasoned trust
  - Sati – mindfulness
  - Hiri – shame at doing evil
  - Ottappa – regard for consequence
  - Alobha – lack of greed
  - Adosa – lack of hatred
    - Mettā – loving kindness (if adosa is developed)
  - Tatramajjhattatā – balance, neutrality of mind (also called upekkhā, equanimity)
  - Kāyapassaddhi – tranquility of mental body
  - Cittapassaddhi – tranquility of consciousness
  - Kāyalahutā – lightness of mental body
  - Cittalahutā – lightness of consciousness
  - Kāyamudutā – malleability/softness of mental body
  - Cittamudutā – malleability/softness of consciousness
  - Kāyakammaññatā – wieldiness of mental body
  - Cittakammaññatā – wieldiness of consciousness
  - Kāyapāguññatā – proficiency of mental body
  - Cittapāguññatā – proficiency of consciousness
  - Kāyujukatā – straightness/rectitude of mental body
  - Cittujukatā – straightness/rectitude of consciousness
- Three Abstinences (virati):
  - Sammāvācā – right speech
  - Sammākammanta – right action
  - Sammā-ājīva – right livelihood
- Two Immeasurables (appamañña):
  - Karuṇā – compassion
  - Mudita – sympathetic joy
- One Faculty of wisdom (paññindriya):
  - Paññā – wisdom (also called amoha, lack of delusion)

Bhikkhu Bodhi states:

Wholesome consciousness (kusalacitta) is consciousness accompanied by the wholesome roots—non-greed or generosity, non-hatred or loving-kindness, and non-delusion or wisdom. Such consciousness is mentally healthy, morally blameless, and productive of pleasant results.

== Mahāyāna Abhidharma tradition ==
Abhidharma studies in the Mahayana tradition are based on the Sanskrit Sarvāstivāda abhidharma system. Within this system, the Abhidharma-samuccaya identifies fifty-one mental factors:

(Note that this list is considered not exhaustive; there are other mental factors mentioned in the Mahāyāna teachings. This list identifies fifty-two important factors that help to understand how the mind functions.) (Note: The lists of mental factors are not considered to be exhaustive. For example: The Dalai Lama states: "Whether the system includes fifty-one mental factors or more or less, none of those sets is meant to be all-inclusive, as though nothing is left out. They are only suggestive, indicative of some things that are important."; Alexander Berzin states: "These lists of subsidiary awarenesses are not exhaustive. There are many more than just fifty-one. Many good qualities (yon-tan) cultivated on the Buddhist path are not listed separately – for example, generosity (sbyin-pa), ethical discipline (tshul-khrims), patience (bzod-pa), love (byams-pa), and compassion (snying-rje). According to the Gelug presentation, the five types of deep awareness (ye-shes) – mirror-like, equalizing, individualizing, accomplishing, and sphere of reality (Skt. dharmadhatu) – are also subsidiary awarenesses. The various lists are just of certain significant categories of subsidiary awarenesses.")

=== Five universal mental factors ===
The five universal mental factors (sarvatraga) are:

1. Sparśa – contact, contacting awareness, sense impression, touch
2. Vedanā – feeling, sensation
3. Saṃjñā – perception
4. Cetanā – volition, intention
5. Manasikāra – attention

These five mental factors are referred to as universal or omnipresent because they operate in the wake of every mind situation. If any one of these factors is missing, then the experience of the object is incomplete. For example:

- If there is no sparśa (contact), then there would be no basis for perception.
- If there is no vedana (feeling, sensation), there is no relishing of the object.
- If there is no saṃjñā (perception), then the specific characteristic of the object is not perceived.
- If there is no cetanā (volition), then there is no movement towards and settling on the object.
- If there is no manasikāra (attention), then there is not holding onto the object.

=== Five object-determining mental factors ===
The five object-determining mental factors (viṣayaniyata) are:

1. Chanda – desire (to act), intention, interest
2. Adhimokṣa – decision, interest, firm conviction
3. Smṛti – mindfulness
4. Prajñā – wisdom
5. Samādhi – concentration

The five factors are referred to as object-determining is because these factors each grasp the specification of the object. When they are steady, there is certainty concerning each object.

=== Eleven virtuous mental factors ===
The eleven virtuous (kuśala) mental factors are:

1. Sraddhā – faith
2. Hrī – self-respect, conscientiousness, sense of shame
3. Apatrāpya – decorum, regard for consequence
4. Alobha – non-attachment
5. Adveṣa – non-aggression, equanimity, lack of hatred
6. Amoha – non-bewilderment
7. Vīrya – diligence, effort
8. Praśrabdhi – pliancy, mental-flexibility
9. Apramāda – conscientiousness
10. Upekṣa – equanimity
11. Ahiṃsā – nonharmfulness, nonviolence

=== Six root unwholesome factors ===
The six root unwholesome factors (mūlakleśa) are:

1. Rāga – attachment
2. Pratigha – anger
3. Avidya – ignorance
4. Māna – pride, conceit
5. Vicikitsa – doubt
6. Dṛṣṭi – wrong view

=== Twenty secondary unwholesome factors ===
The twenty secondary unwholesome factors (upakleśa) are:

1. Krodha – rage, fury
2. Upanāha – resentment
3. Mrakśa – concealment, slyness-concealment
4. Pradāśa – spitefulness
5. Īrṣyā – envy, jealousy
6. Mātsarya – stinginess, avarice, miserliness
7. Māyā – pretense, deceit
8. Śāṭhya – hypocrisy, dishonesty
9. Mada – self-infatuation, mental inflation, self-satisfaction
10. Vihiṃsā – malice, hostility, cruelty, intention to harm
11. Āhrīkya – lack of shame, lack of conscience, shamelessness
12. Anapatrāpya – lack of propriety, disregard, shamelessness
13. Styāna – lethargy, gloominess
14. Auddhatya – excitement, ebullience
15. Āśraddhya – lack of faith, lack of trust
16. Kauśīdya – laziness, slothfulness
17. Pramāda – heedlessness, carelessness, unconcern
18. Muṣitasmṛtitā – forgetfulness
19. Asaṃprajanya – non-alertness, inattentiveness
20. Vikṣepa – distraction, desultoriness

=== Four changeable mental factors ===
The four changeable mental factors (aniyata) are:

1. Kaukṛitya – regret, worry,
2. Middha – sleep, drowsiness
3. Vitarka – conception, selectiveness, examination
4. Vicāra – discernment, discursiveness, analysis

== Alternate translations ==
Alternate translations for the term mental factors (Sanskrit: caitasika) include:

- Mental factors (Geshe Tashi Tsering, Jeffrey Hopkins, Bhikkhu Bodhi, N.K.G. Mendis)
- Mental events (Herbert Guenther)
- Mental states (Erik Pema Kunzang, Nārada Thera)
- Concomitants (N.K.G. Mendis)
- Concomitants of consciousness (Bhikkhu Bodhi)
- Subsidiary awareness (Alexander Berzin)

== See also ==
- Kleshas (Buddhism)
- Saṅkhāra
- Three poisons

== Sources ==
- Berzin, Alexander (2006). Primary Minds and the 51 Mental Factors. Study Buddhism.
- Bhikkhu Bodhi (1995–1012). A Comprehensive Manual of Abhidhamma. Buddhist Publication Society.
- Geshe Tashi Tsering (2006). Buddhist Psychology: The Foundation of Buddhist Thought. Perseus Books Group. Kindle Edition.
- Goleman, Daniel (2008). Destructive Emotions: A Scientific Dialogue with the Dalai Lama. Bantam. Kindle Edition.
- Guenther, Herbert V. & Leslie S. Kawamura (1975), Mind in Buddhist Psychology: A Translation of Ye-shes rgyal-mtshan's "The Necklace of Clear Understanding". Dharma Publishing. Kindle Edition.
- Kunsang, Erik Pema (translator) (2004). Gateway to Knowledge, Vol. 1. North Atlantic Books.
- Nārada Thera. Abhidhammattha-sangaha
- Traleg Rinpoche (1993). The Abhidharmasamuccaya: Teachings by the Venerable Traleg Kyabgon Rinpoche. The Kagyu E-Vam Buddhist Institute.
