= Mrakśa =

Concept in Buddhism

Translations of Mrakśa
- English: concealment, slyness-concealment
- Sanskrit: mrakśa
- Chinese: 覆
- Tibetan: འཆབ་པ། (Wylie: 'chab pa; THL: chabpa)

Mrakśa (Sanskrit; Tibetan phonetic: chabpa) is a Buddhist term translated as "concealment" or "slyness-concealment". It is defined as concealing or covering up one's faults or uncommendable actions, from either oneself or others. It is one of the twenty subsidiary unwholesome mental factors within the Mahayana Abhidharma teachings.

The Abhidharma-samuccaya states:

What is slyness-concealment? It is to perpetuate a state of unresolvedness because of its association with dullness and stubbornness [gti-ruug] when one is urged towards something positive. Slyness-concealment has the function of preventing one from making it clean break with it and feeling relieved.

Alan Wallace states: "Concealment from one's own vices is a type of delusion that stems from ignorance. This includes self-concealment."

== See also ==
- Mental factors (Buddhism)

== Sources ==
- Goleman, Daniel (2008), Destructive Emotions: A Scientific Dialogue with the Dalai Lama, Bantam, Kindle Edition
- Guenther, Herbert V. (1975), Mind in Buddhist Psychology: A Translation of Ye-shes rgyal-mtshan's "The Necklace of Clear Understanding", Dharma Publishing, Kindle Edition
- Kunsang, Erik Pema (2004), Gateway to Knowledge, Vol. 1, North Atlantic Books
