= Lahutā =

Translations of Lahutā
- English: lightness
- Pali: Lahutā
- Indonesian: peringanan
- Vietnamese: Khinh (氫) (nhẹ); Kāyalahutā: Khinh thân Cittalahutā: Khinh tâm

Lahutā (Pali) is a Buddhist term translated as "lightness", and it is the basis for the following pair of mental factors within the Theravada Abhidharma teachings:

- Kāyalahutā - lightness of mental body (or lightness of cetasikas)
- Cittalahutā - lightness of consciousness (or lightness of citta)

These two mental factors have the characteristic of the subsiding of heaviness (garubhāva) in the mental body and consciousness, respectively.

== Definition ==
Bhikkhu Bodhi states:

The twofold lightness has the characteristic of the subsiding of heaviness (garubhāva) in the mental body and consciousness, respectively. Its function is to crush heaviness. It is manifested as non-sluggishness. Its proximate cause is the mental body and consciousness. It should be regarded as opposed to such defilements as sloth and torpor, which create heaviness.

Nina van Gorkom explains:

According to the Dhammasangani (par 42, 43) this pair of cetasikas consists in the absence of sluggishness and inertia, they have “alertness in varying”. The meaning of this will be clearer when we read what the Mula-Tīkā states about lightness of citta: “the capacity of the mind to turn very quickly to a wholesome object or to the contemplation of impermanence, etc.”

The Atthasālinī (I, Book I, Part IV, Chapter I, 30) states:

Kāya-lightness is buoyancy of mental factors; citta-lightness is buoyancy of consciousness. They have the characteristic of suppressing the heaviness of the one and the other; the function of crushing heaviness in both; the manifestation of opposition to sluggishness in both, and have mental factors and consciousness as proximate cause. They are the opponents of the corruptions, such as sloth and torpor, which cause heaviness and rigidity in mental factors and consciousness.

== See also ==
- Mental factors (Buddhism)
- Samadhi (Buddhism)

== Sources ==
- Bhikkhu Bodhi (2012), A Comprehensive Manual of Abhidhamma: The Abhidhammattha Sangaha (Vipassana Meditation and the Buddha's Teachings), Independent Publishers Group Kindle Edition
- van Gorkom, Nina (2010), Cetasikas, Zolag
