= Kammaññatā =

Translations of Kammaññatā
- English: wieldiness, workableness, readiness
- Pali: kammaññatā
- Indonesian: kecekatan
- Vietnamese: Thích Kāya-kammaññatā: Thích thân Citta-kammaññatā: Thích tâm

Kammaññatā (Pali) is a Buddhist term translated as "wieldiness", and it is the basis for the following pair of mental factors within the Theravada Abhidharma teachings:

- Kāya-kammaññatā - wieldiness of mental body (or "wieldiness of cetasikas")
- Citta-kammaññatā - wieldiness of consciousness (or "wieldiness of citta")

These two mental factors have the characteristic of the subsiding of unwieldiness (akammaññabhāva) in the mental body and consciousness, respectively.

== Definition ==
Bhikkhu Bodhi states:

The twofold wieldiness has the characteristic of the subsiding of unwieldiness (akammaññabhāva) in the mental body and consciousness, respectively. Its function is to crush unwieldiness. It is manifested as success of the mental body and consciousness in making something an object. Its proximate cause is the mental body and consciousness. It should be regarded as opposed to the remaining hindrances, which create unwieldiness of the mental body and consciousness.

Nina van Gorkom explains:

Kammaññatā can be translated as wieldiness or workableness. The Atthasālinī (I, Book I, Part IV, Chapter I, 131) explains that they suppress unwieldiness in cetasikas and citta, and that they should be regarded as “bringing faith in objects of faith, and patient application in works of advantage, and are like purity of gold.”
When there is wieldiness, citta and cetasikas are like gold which has been made workable. The Mula-Tīkā expresses this as follows:

Workableness signifies that specific or suitable degree of pliancy or softness which makes the gold, that is, the mind, workable. While the mind is in the flames of passion it is too soft to be workable, as molten gold is. If, on the contrary, the mind is too rigid then it is comparable to untempered gold.

Wieldiness is the opponent of the “hindrances”, such as sensuous desire (kamacchanda) and anger or hate (vyapada), which cause mental unwieldiness.

== See also ==
- Mental factors (Buddhism)
- Samadhi (Buddhism)

== Sources ==
- Bhikkhu Bodhi (2012), A Comprehensive Manual of Abhidhamma: The Abhidhammattha Sangaha (Vipassana Meditation and the Buddha's Teachings), Independent Publishers Group Kindle Edition
- van Gorkom, Nina (2010), Cetasikas, Zolag
