= Vitality =

Capacity to live, grow, or develop

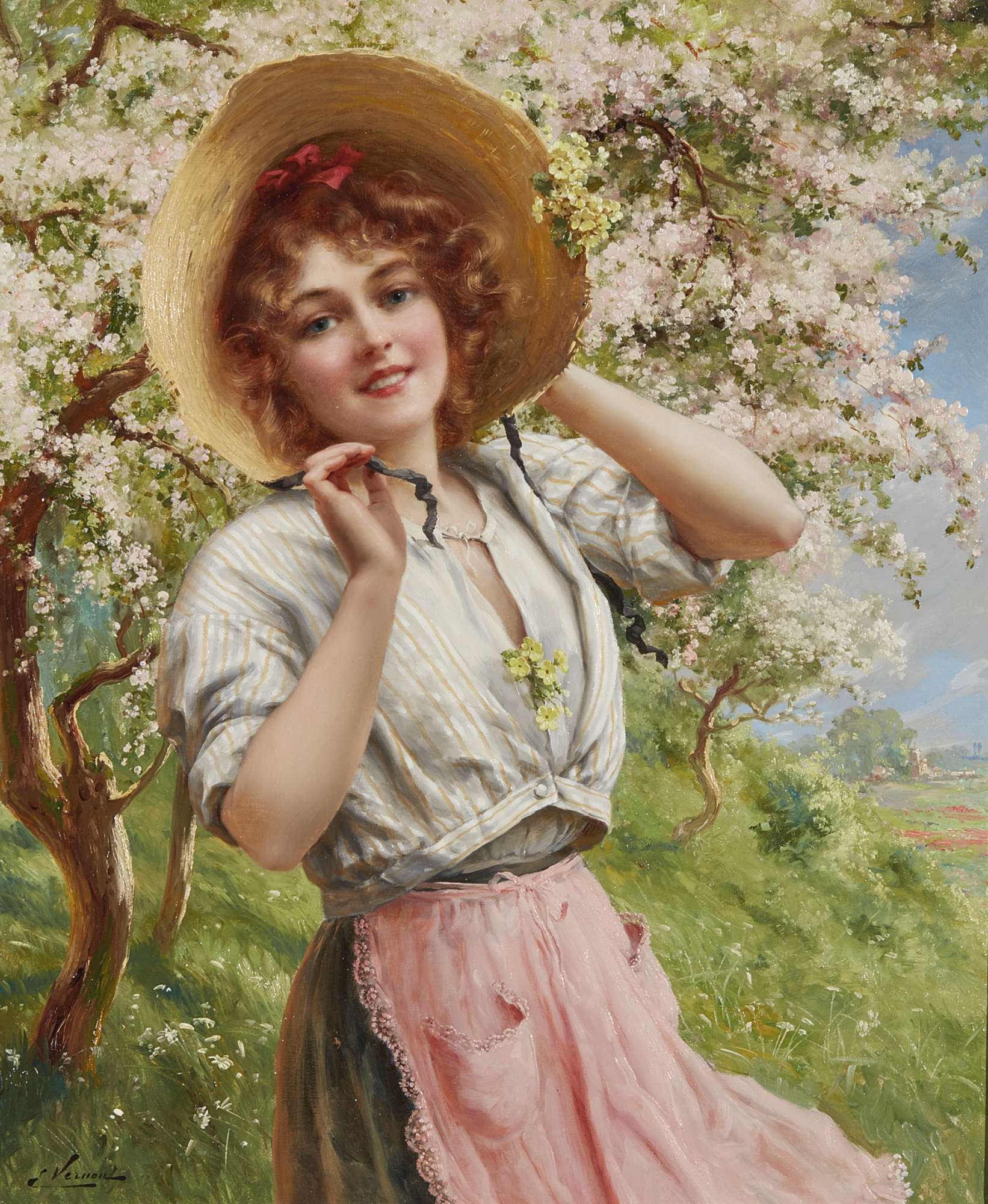
Springtime by Émile Vernon, an artistic depiction of seasonal vitality

Vitality (from Middle French vitalité, from Latin vītālitās, from Latin vīta 'life') is the capacity to live, grow, or develop. Vitality is also the characteristic that distinguishes living from non-living things. To experience vitality is regarded as a basic psychological drive and, in philosophy, a component to the will to live. As such, people seek to maximize their vitality or their experience of vitality—that which corresponds to an enhanced physiological capacity and mental state.

== Overview ==
The pursuit and maintenance of health and vitality have been at the forefront of medicine and natural philosophy throughout history. Life depends upon various biological processes known as vital processes. Historically, these vital processes have been viewed as having either mechanistic or non-mechanistic causes. The latter point of view is characteristic of vitalism, the doctrine that the phenomena of life cannot be explained by purely chemical and physical mechanisms.

Prior to the 19th century, theoreticians often held that human lifespan had been less limited in the past, and that aging was due to a loss of, and failure to maintain, vitality. A commonly held view was that people are born with finite vitality, which diminishes over time until illness and debility set in, and finally death.

== Religion ==
In traditional cultures, the capacity for life is often directly equated with the soul or breath. This can be found in the Hindu concept prana, where vitality in the body derives from a subtle principle in the air and in food, as well as in Hebrew and ancient Greek texts.

=== Jainism ===
According to Jainism, there are ten vitalities or life-principles:

- The five senses (touch, taste, smell, sight, hearing)
- Energy
- Respiration
- Life-duration
- The organ of speech
- The mind

According to major Jain text, Tattvarthsutra: "The severance of vitalities out of passion is injury". Because life is to be considered sacred and in every living thing, Jains avoid killing any living creature. They are not only vegetarian, but decline to eat vegetables that grow under the ground because each underground stem contains infinite number of vitalities each of that can potentially grow into full-fledged plants. The table below summarizes the vitalities that living beings possess in accordance with their senses:

Senses	Number of vitalities	Vitalities
One sense	Four	Sense organ of touch, strength of body or energy, respiration, and life-duration.
Two sense	Six	The sense of taste and the organ of speech in addition to the former four.
Three sense	Seven	The sense of smell in addition to the former six.
Four sense	Eight	The sense of sight in addition to the former seven.
Five-sensed beings	Nine	The sense of hearing in addition to the former eight.
Five-sensed beings	Ten	Mind in addition to the above-mentioned nine vitalities.

== Vitality and DNA damage ==
Low vitality or fatigue is a common complaint by older patients. Low vitality is an early indicator of frailty and may reflect an underlying medical illness. Vitality level was measured in 2,487 Copenhagen patients using a standardized, subjective, self-reported vitality scale and was found to be inversely related to DNA damage (as measured in peripheral blood mononuclear cells). DNA damage indicates cellular disfunction.

== See also ==
- Jīvitindriya
- Urban vitality
- Vitalism
