= Mudutā =

Buddhist term for malleability

Translations of mudutā
- English: malleability, softness, pliancy
- Pali: mudutā
- Chinese: 柔
- Indonesian: kelenturan
- Vietnamese: Nhu (柔) Kāyamudutā: Nhu thân Cittamudutā: Nhu tâm

Mudutā (Pali) is a Buddhist term translated as "malleability", and it is the basis for the following pair of mental factors within the Theravada Abhidharma teachings:

- Kāyamudutā - malleability of mental body (or pliancy of cetasika)
- Cittamudutā - malleability of consciousness (or pliancy of citta)

These two mental factors have the characteristic of the subsiding of rigidity (thambha) in the mental body and consciousness, respectively.

== Definition ==
Bhikkhu Bodhi states:

The twofold malleability has the characteristic of the subsiding of rigidity (thambha) in the mental body and consciousness, respectively. Its function is to crush rigidity. It is manifested as non-resistance, and its proximate cause is the mental body and consciousness. It should be regarded as opposed to such defilements as wrong views and conceit, which create rigidity.

Nina van Gorkom explains:

According to the Dhammasangani (par 44, 45) this pair of cetasikas consist in suavity, smoothness and absence of rigidity.

The Atthasālinī (I, Book I, Part IV, Chapter I, 130) states:

They have the characteristic of suppressing the rigidity of mental factors and of consciousness; the function of crushing the same in both; the manifestation or effect of setting up no resistance; and have mental factors and consciousness as proximate cause. They are the opponents of the corruptions, such as opinionatedness (diṭṭhi) and conceit which cause mental rigidity.

== See also ==
- Mental factors (Buddhism)
- Samadhi (Buddhism)

== Sources ==
- Bhikkhu Bodhi (2012), A Comprehensive Manual of Abhidhamma: The Abhidhammattha Sangaha (Vipassana Meditation and the Buddha's Teachings), Independent Publishers Group Kindle Edition
- van Gorkom, Nina (2010), Cetasikas, Zolag
