= Pāguññatā =

Buddhist term

Translations of Pāguññatā
- English: proficiency
- Pali: pāguññatā
- Indonesian: kecakapan
- Vietnamese: Thuần Kāya-pāguññatā: Thuần thân Citta-pāguññatā: Thuần tâm

Pāguññatā (Pali) is a Buddhist term translated as "proficiency", and it is the basis for the following pair of mental factors within the Theravada Abhidharma teachings:

- Kāya-pāguññatā - proficiency of mental body (or proficiency of cetasikas)
- Citta-pāguññatā - proficiency of consciousness (or proficiency of citta)

These two mental factors have the characteristic of healthiness of the mental body and consciousness, respectively.

== Definition ==
Bhikkhu Bodhi states:

The twofold proficiency has the characteristic of healthiness of the mental body and consciousness, respectively. Its function is to crush unhealthiness of the mental body and consciousness. It is manifested as absence of disability. Its proximate cause is the mental body and consciousness. It should be regarded as opposed to lack of faith, etc., which cause unhealthiness of the mental body and consciousness.

Nina van Gorkom explains:

According to the Dhammasangani (par 48, 49) this pair of cetasikas consists in fitness, competence and efficiency. Pāguññatā is fitness, competence or efficiency in the performance of kusala.
The Atthasālinī (I, Book I, Part IV, Chapter I, 131) explains that proficiency of cetasikas and of citta suppress mental illness and that they are the opponents of the corruptions, such as diffidence, which cause mental illness.
When the citta is akusala citta, there is diffidence, lack of confidence in kusala and then there is mental sickness. Mental proficiency assists the kusala citta and then citta and cetasikas are healthy and skilful so that they can perform their functions in the most efficient way.

== See also ==
- Mental factors (Buddhism)
- Samadhi (Buddhism)

== Sources ==
- Bhikkhu Bodhi (2012), A Comprehensive Manual of Abhidhamma: The Abhidhammattha Sangaha (Vipassana Meditation and the Buddha's Teachings), Independent Publishers Group Kindle Edition
- van Gorkom, Nina (2010), Cetasikas, Zolag
