= Pratigha =

Translations of pratigha
- English: anger, repugnance
- Sanskrit: pratigha
- Pali: paṭigha
- Chinese: 恚(T) / 恚(S)
- Korean: 진 (RR: jin)
- Tibetan: ཁོང་ཁྲོ་ (Wylie: khong khro; THL: kong tro)

Pratigha (Sanskrit; Pali: paṭigha; Tibetan Wylie: khong khro) is a Buddhist term that is translated as "anger". It is defined as a hostile attitude towards sentient beings, towards frustration, and towards that which gives rise to one's frustrations; it functions as a basis for faultfinding, for negative actions, and for not finding a moment of peace or happiness.

Pratigha is identified as:

- One of the six root unwholesome mental factors within the Mahayana Abhidharma tradition
- One of the ten fetters in the Theravada tradition (according to the Dhammasangani)

== Definitions ==
=== Theravada ===
Patigha (Pali) is defined by Theravada sources as: anger, repulsion, collision; animosity; irritation; indignation.

Nyanatiloka Mahatheran provides the following definition:

1. In an ethical sense, it means: 'repugnance', grudge, resentment, anger, and is a synonym of byāpāda, 'ill-will' (s. nīvaraṇa) and dosa, 'hate' (s. mūla). It is one of the proclivities (anusaya, q.v.).
2. '(Sense-) reaction'. Applied to five-sense cognition, p. occurs in the following contexts:

(a) as paṭigha-saññā, 'perception of sense-reaction', said to be absent in the immaterial absorptions (s. jhāna 5). Alternative renderings: resistance-perception, reflex-perception;
(b) as paṭigha-samphassa, '(mental) impression caused by 5fold sensorial reaction' (D. 15); s. phassa;
(c) as Sappaṭigha-rūpa, 'reacting corporeality', and appaṭigha, 'not reacting', which is an Abhidhammic classification of corporeality, occurring in Dhs. 659, 1050. Sappaṭigha are called the physical sense-organs as reacting (or responding) to sense stimuli; and also the physical sense-objects as impinging (or making an impact) on the sense-organs. All other corporeality is appaṭigha, non-reacting and non-impinging. These 2 terms have been variously rendered as resistant and not, responding and not, with and without impact.

=== Mahayana ===
The Abhidharma-samuccaya states:

What is pratigha? It is ill-will with regard to living beings, with regard to suffering and with regard to things pertaining to suffering. Its function is to produce a basis for unhappy states and bad conduct.

Alexander Berzin states that pratigha is aimed at "another limited being, one's own suffering, or situations entailing suffering". This involves being impatient with the objects of the pratigha (anger), and wishing to get rid of them, for example, by striking out against them and harming them. It is based on regarding the object as unattractive or repulsive by its very nature.

Berzin identifies dvesha (aversion) as a subcategory of pratigha (anger) that is directed primarily, although not exclusively, at limited beings.

== Alternate translations ==
- Anger (Herbert Guenther, Alexander Berzin)
- Repugnance (Walpola Rahula)
- Resistance (Thanissaro Bhikkhu)
- Harshness (Bhikkhu Sujato)

== See also ==
- Dvesha
- Kleshas (Buddhism)
- Mental factors (Buddhism)
- Three poisons

== Sources ==
- Berzin, Alexander (2006), Primary Minds and the 51 Mental Factors
- Chögyam Trungpa (2009). The Truth of Suffering and the Path of Liberation. Shambhala.
- Goleman, Daniel (2008). Destructive Emotions: A Scientific Dialogue with the Dalai Lama. Bantam. Kindle Edition.
- Guenther, Herbert V. & Leslie S. Kawamura (1975), Mind in Buddhist Psychology: A Translation of Ye-shes rgyal-mtshan's "The Necklace of Clear Understanding" Dharma Publishing. Kindle Edition.
- Kunsang, Erik Pema (translator) (2004). Gateway to Knowledge, Vol. 1. North Atlantic Books.
- Walpola Rahula (2007). What the Buddha Taught. Grove Press. Kindle Edition
