= Neutrality (philosophy) =

Tendency not to side in a conflict

In philosophy, neutrality is the tendency to not take a side in a conflict (physical or ideological), which may not suggest neutral parties do not have a side or are not a side themselves. In colloquial use, neutral can be synonymous with unbiased. However, bias is a favoritism for one side, distinct from the tendency to act on that favoritism. Neutrality is distinct (though not exclusive) from apathy, ignorance, indifference, doublethink, equality, agreement, and objectivity. Apathy and indifference each imply a level of carelessness about a subject, though a person exhibiting neutrality may feel bias on a subject but choose not to act on it. A neutral person can also be well-informed on a subject and therefore need not be ignorant. Since they can be biased, a neutral person need not feature doublethink (i.e. accepting both sides as correct), equality (i.e. viewing both sides as equal), or agreement (a form of group decision-making; here it would require negotiating a solution on everyone's opinion, including one's own which may not be unbiased). Objectivity suggests siding with the more reasonable position (except journalistic objectivity), where reasonableness is judged by some common basis between the sides, such as logic (thereby avoiding the problem of incommensurability). Neutrality implies tolerance regardless of how disagreeable, deplorable, or unusual a perspective might be.

In moderation and mediation, neutrality is often expected to make judgments or facilitate dialogue independent of any bias, emphasizing on the process rather than the outcome. For example, a neutral party is seen as a party with no (or a fully disclosed) conflict of interest in a conflict, and is expected to operate as if it has no bias. Neutral parties are often perceived as more trustworthy, reliable, and safe. Alternative to acting without a bias, the bias of neutrality itself is the expectation upon the Swiss government (in armed neutrality), and the International Federation of Red Cross and Red Crescent Societies (in non-interventionism). The Oxford English Dictionary documents that, by at least 1897, "neutral" meant applying the rules to the facts, as in football "Neutral linesmen shall officiate in all games." In the Supreme Court decision Board of Regents of the University of Wisconsin System v. Southworth based on the United States Constitution's First Amendment, the court decided some funding decisions should be made through a neutral viewpoint.

== Criticisms and views ==
Neutrality has been criticised as an unethical option, the argument being that the neutral option can, directly or indirectly, end up favoring those who harm others or maintain a state of injustice, such as "You are either with us, or against us". Italian writer Dante Alighieri, in his Divine Comedy, says in Inferno Canto III that people and angels who were not rebels nor faithful to their God, but stood apart, and who never were alive, were naked, and were stung exceedingly and eternally by gadflies and hornets. Theodore Roosevelt, quoting Dante's work in his America and the World War (1915), said "Dante reserved a special place of infamy in the inferno for those base angels who dared side neither with evil nor with good". South African priest Desmond Tutu said: "If you are neutral in situations of injustice, you have chosen the side of the oppressor." Woodrow Wilson said: "Neutrality is a negative word. It does not express what America ought to feel. We are not trying to keep out of trouble; we are trying to preserve the foundations on which peace may be rebuilt."

== See also ==
- Alternative dispute resolution
- Justice
- Tatramajjhattatā
- Detachment
