= Krodha =

Krodha may refer to:

- Krodha (Mental factor), a mental factor in Indian religions, translated as fury or rage; it causes one to harm others
  - Krodh, wrath or rage in Sikhism
- Wrathful deities, in Buddhism, enlightened beings who take on wrathful forms in order to lead sentient beings to enlightenment
- Krodha (Hinduism), anger; the father of Kali
- Krodh (film), 2000 Indian film
- Krodham, 1982 Indian film
  - Krodham 2, 2000 film by Prem Menon

== See also ==
- Krodhi, 1981 Indian film
- Krodhavasa, wife of Kashyapa in Hindu texts
