= Kauśīdya =

Translations of Kausidya
- English: laziness, spiritual sloth
- Sanskrit: kausidya, kauśīdya
- Chinese: 懈怠
- Tibetan: ལེ་ལོ། (Wylie: le lo; THL: lelo)
- Vietnamese: lười biếng, giải đãi

Kausidya (Sanskrit; Tibetan Wylie: le lo) is a Buddhist term translated as "laziness" or "spiritual sloth". It is defined as clinging to unwholesome activities such as lying down and stretching out, and to procrastinate, and not being enthusiastic about or engaging in virtuous activity. It is identified as:

- One of the twenty subsidiary unwholesome mental factors within the Mahayana Abhidharma teachings.
- One of the five faults or obstacles to shamatha meditation within the Mahayana teachings.
- Closely related to the Pali term thina, that is identified as one of the fourteen unwholesome mental factors within the Theravada Abhidharma teachings

== Explanation ==
Mipham Rinpoche states:

Laziness (kausidya) is to cling to unwholesome activities such as lying down, resting, or stretching out, and to procrastinate, without taking delight in and engaging in what is virtuous. It is the opponent of diligence (vīrya).

The Abhidharma-samuccaya states:

What is laziness (kausidya)? It is an unwilling mind, associated with bewilderment-erring, relying on the pleasures of drowsiness, lying down and not getting up. Its function is to obstruct and hinder one in applying himself to positive things.

Alan Wallace explains that kausidya (lelo in Tibetan) refers to a very specific type of laziness, that is concerned only with virtuous activity. Wallace explains:

[...] lelo in Tibetan, is often translated as ‘laziness,’ but it is much more specific. If a person is working sixteen hours a day, hellbent on earning a whole lot of money with absolutely no concern for virtue, from a Buddhist perspective you could say that person is subject to lelo. A workaholic is clearly not lazy, but such a person is seen as lelo in the sense of being completely lethargic and slothful with regard to the cultivation of virtue and purification of the mind. Our translation of this term is ‘spiritual sloth,’ which we have taken from the Christian tradition, where it is very comparable to the Buddhist notion.

== Three types ==
The Mahayana tradition identifies three types of laziness: not wanting to do anything; discouragement; and busyness.

Laziness of not wanting to do anything

- We'd rather stay in bed half an hour later than get up and meditate.
- Sakyong Mipham explains this type of laziness from the meditative point of view: "The mind has withdrawn into itself. [...] It feels impossible to do anything. We feel like a snake crawling along the ground."

Laziness of discouragement (or feeling ourselves unworthy)

- This involves thinking, "I can't do this., or self doubt"
- Sakyong Mipham states: "We feel discouraged, deflated, or outnumbered by the obstacles that arise in our practice. We take them personally. Our belief in the solidity of obstacles grows, and our belief in our ability to practice shrinks."

Laziness of being busy with worldly things.

- Tenzin Palmo states: "This is the point—we fill our lives with activities. Many of them are really very good activities but if we are not careful, they can just be an escape. I'm not saying that you shouldn't do good and necessary things, but there has to be breathing in as well as breathing out."
- Sakyong Mipham states: "Speediness is laziness when we use it as a way to avoid working with our minds."

== Antidotes ==
Traditional texts identify four antidotes to laziness in the context of meditation practice. Sakyong Mipham identifies these antidotes as follows:

- Suppleness: involves being curious, having a sense of appreciation and imagination
- Trust: develops from experiencing the benefits of meditation practice
- Aspiration: is trust with a sense of determination
- Effort: an engaged mind that moves toward the act of meditation.

== See also ==
- Mental factors (Buddhism)
- Thina

== Sources ==
- Goleman, Daniel (2008), Destructive Emotions: A Scientific Dialogue with the Dalai Lama, Bantam, Kindle Edition
- Guenther, Herbert V.; Kawamura, Leslie S. (1975), Mind in Buddhist Psychology: A Translation of Ye-shes rgyal-mtshan's "The Necklace of Clear Understanding, Dharma Publishing. Kindle Edition
- Kunsang, Erik Pema (2004), Gateway to Knowledge, Vol. 1, North Atlantic Books
- Sakyong Mimpham (2003), Turning the Mind into an Ally, Riverhead Books, pp. 84–101
