= Tatramajjhattatā =

Concept in Buddhism

Translations of Tatramajjhattatā
- English: equanimity neutrality of mind
- Pali: Tatramajjhattatā
- Indonesian: keseimbangan batin
- Vietnamese: trung bình

Tatramajjhattatā (Pali) is a Buddhist term that is translated as "equanimity", "neutrality of mind", etc. In the Theravada tradition, it is defined as a mental attitude of balance, detachment, and impartiality.

Tatramajjhattatā is identified as:

- One of the twenty-five beautiful mental factors within the Theravada Abhidharma teachings
- A synonym of upekkha

== Explanations ==
=== Theravada ===
Bhikkhu Bodhi explains:

The Pali term for this cetasika literally means "there in the middleness." It is a synonym for equanimity (upekkha), not as neutral feeling, but as a mental attitude of balance, detachment, and impartiality. It has the characteristic of conveying consciousness and the mental factors evenly. Its function is to prevent deficiency and excess, or to prevent partiality. It is manifested as neutrality. It should be seen as the state of looking on with equanimity in the citta and cetasikas, like a charioteer who looks on with equanimity at the thoroughbreds progressing evenly along the roadway.

The Visuddhimagga (XIV, 153) states about equanimity:

It has the characteristic of conveying citta and cetasikas evenly. Its function is to prevent deficiency and excess, or its function is to inhibit partiality. It is manifested as neutrality. It should be regarded as like a conductor (driver) who looks on with equanimity on thoroughbreds progressing evenly.

Nina van Gorkom explains:

When there is equanimity there is neither elation nor depression. The object which is experienced is viewed with impartiality and neutrality, just as a charioteer treats with impartiality his well-trained horses. Equanimity effects the balance of the citta and the other cetasikas it arises together with. There is no balance of mind when akusala citta arises, when we are cross, greedy, avaricious or ignorant. Whereas when we are generous, observe morality (sīla), develop calm or develop right understanding of nāma and rūpa, there is balance of mind.

== See also ==
- Mental factors (Buddhism)

== Sources ==
- Bhikkhu Bodhi (2003), A Comprehensive Manual of Abhidhamma, Pariyatti Publishing
- Nina van Gorkom (2010), Cetasikas, Zolag
