= Jīvitindriya =

Translations of Jīvitindriya
- English: life faculty, vitality
- Sanskrit: jīvitindriya
- Pali: jīvitindriya
- Burmese: ဇီဝိတိန္ဒြိယ
- Chinese: 命根
- Thai: ชีวิตินทรีย์ (RTGS: chiwitinsi)
- Vietnamese: mạng quyền

Jīvitindriya (Sanskrit and Pali) is a Buddhist term translated as "life faculty" or "vitality". Jīvitindriya is identified as one of the seven universal mental factors within the Theravada abhidharma teachings. In this context, jīvitindriya is defined as a mental factor that sustains the life of the citta (mind) and other mental factors it accompanies. The characteristic of jīvitindriya is said to be “ceaseless watching”.

== Definition ==
=== Theravada ===
Bhikkhu Bodhi states:

There are two kinds of life faculty, the mental, which vitalizes the associated mental states, and the physical, which vitalizes material phenomena. The mental life faculty alone is intended as a cetasika. It has the characteristic of maintaining the associated mental states, the function of making them occur, manifestation as the establishing of their presence, and its proximate cause is the mental states to be maintained.

=== Mahayana ===
Within the Mahayana Buddhist teachings, there are a variety of definitions for jīvitindriya. The Dharmaskandhapadashastra (an early Abhidharma work of the Sarvastivadin school) defines jīvitindriya as: a faculty that persists, continues, maintains, animates, and operates what we called sentient beings.

== Etymology ==
Jīvitaṃ means “life”, and indriya means “controlling faculty”.

== See also ==
- Indriya
- Mental factors (Buddhism)
- Qi or Chi

== Sources ==
- Bhikkhu Bodhi (2012), A Comprehensive Manual of Abhidhamma: The Abhidhammattha Sangaha (Vipassana Meditation and the Buddha's Teachings), Independent Publishers Group Kindle Edition
- Nina van Gorkom (2010), Cetasikas, Zolag
- Soonil Hwang (2006), Metaphor and Literalism in Buddhism: The Doctrinal History of Nirvana, Routledge
