= Moha (Buddhism) =

Buddhist concept

Translations of moha
- English: illusion, delusion
- Sanskrit: मोह moha
- Pali: 𑀫𑁄𑀳, moha
- Burmese: မောဟ
- Chinese: 癡 (Pinyin: chī)
- Indonesian: delusi, kebodohan batin, kekeliruan
- Japanese: 痴 (Rōmaji: chi)
- Khmer: មោហៈ, មោហ៍ (UNGEGN: Moŭhă, Moŭh)
- Tibetan: གཏི་མུག (Wylie: gti mug; THL: timuk)
- Thai: โมหะ
- Vietnamese: Si 癡

Moha (Sanskrit: मोह; Pali: 𑀫𑁄𑀳; Tibetan phonetic: timuk) is a concept in both Hinduism and Buddhism, meaning illusion or delusion. In Hinduism, it is one of the six arishadvargas (also known as shadripus). In Buddhist thought, Moha, along with Raga (greed, sensual attachment) and Dvesha (aversion, hate) are unskillful roots that lead to Taṇhā (craving) which is part of the Twelve Nidanas that propel the wheel of life. It is symbolically present as the pig in the center of Tibetan bhavachakra drawings. Moha refers to desire and attachment to the world or worldly matters. It is sometimes synonymous with "ignorance" (Avijjā).

Moha is identified in the following contexts within the teachings of Buddhism and Hinduism:

- One of the three unwholesome roots within the Theravada Buddhist tradition
- One of the fourteen unwholesome mental factors within the Theravada Abhidharma teachings
- Equivalent to avijjā within the Theravada Abhidharma teachings
- One of the three poisons within the Mahayana Buddhist tradition.

== Etymology and meaning ==
Moha appears in the Vedic literature, and has roots in the early Vedic word mogha which means "empty, unreal, vain, useless, foolish". The term, as well as the three defects concept appears in the ancient texts of Jainism and some schools of Hinduism such as Nyaya, in their respective discussion of the theory of rebirths.

The term means "illusion", "delusion, confusion, dullness". The opposite of Moha is Prajna (insight, wisdom). Beliefs different from those considered as insights in Buddhism, are forms of delusions or Moha in Buddhism. Moha is one of the roots of evil, in the Buddhist belief.

== Application ==
Within the Mahayana tradition, moha is classified as one of the three poisons, which are considered to be the root cause of suffering.

In the Mahayana tradition, moha is considered to be a subcategory of avidyā. Whereas avidyā is defined as a fundamental ignorance, moha is defined as an ignorance of cause and effect or of reality that accompanies only destructive states of mind or behavior. Moha is sometimes replaced by avidyā in lists of the three poisons. In contemporary explanations of the three poisons, teachers are likely to emphasize the fundamental ignorance of avidyā rather than moha.

== Amoha ==
Amoha (Sanskrit, Pali; Tibetan Wylie: gti mug med pa) is a Buddhist term translated as "non-delusion" or "non-bewilderment". It is defined as being without delusion concerning what is true, due to discrimination; its function is to cause one to not engage in unwholesome actions. It is one of the mental factors within the Abhidharma teachings.

The Abhidharma-samuccaya states:

What is non-deludedness? It is a thorough comprehension of (practical) knowledge that comes from maturation, instructions, thinking and understanding, and its function is to provide a basis for not becoming involved in evil behavior.

Herbert Guenther states:

It is a distinct discriminatory awareness to counteract the deludedness that has its cause in either what one has been born into or what one has acquired.

== See also ==
- Kleshas (Buddhism)
- Mental factors (Buddhism)
- Three poisons (Buddhism)
- Mohā

== Sources ==
- Ajahn Sucitto (2010). Turning the Wheel of Truth: Commentary on the Buddha's First Teaching. Shambhala.
- Mingyur Rinpoche (2007). The Joy of Living: Unlocking the Secret and Science of Happiness. Harmony. Kindle Edition.
- Guenther, Herbert V. & Leslie S. Kawamura (1975), Mind in Buddhist Psychology: A Translation of Ye-shes rgyal-mtshan's "The Necklace of Clear Understanding". Dharma Publishing. Kindle Edition.
- Kunsang, Erik Pema (translator) (2004). Gateway to Knowledge, Vol. 1. North Atlantic Books.
