= Dhammasaṅgaṇī =

Buddhist scripture

- SuttaCentral; OpenTipitaka
- Type: Canonical text
- Parent: Abhidhamma Piṭaka
- Attribution: Bhāṇaka
- Aṭṭhakathā: Aṭṭhasālinī (Dhammasaṅgaṇī-aṭṭhakathā)
- Commentator: Buddhaghosa
- Ṭīkā: Dhammasaṅgaṇīmūlatīkā; Dhammasaṅgaṇīanutīkā
- Abbreviation: Ds; Dhs; DhS

The Dhammasaṅgaṇī (Pāli; lit. 'Collection of Dhammas'; Vietnamese: Bộ Pháp Tụ), also known as the Dhammasaṅgaha, is a Buddhist scripture, part of the Pali Canon of Theravada Buddhism. It is the first of the seven texts of the Abhidhamma Pitaka.

The book begins with a matika (Pali for "matrix"), which is a list of classifications of dhammas, variously translated as ideas, phenomena, states, patterns etc. The text lacks a nidana, though the commentaries record that attempts were made at creating one that depicted the Buddha preaching the Abhidhamma in one of the heavenly realms. Theravada tradition attributes the Dhammasaṅgaṇī to Sariputra, who is held to have recited the Abhidhamma as part of the sutta texts at the First Buddhist Council, and regards it as one of the canonical teachings that Mahinda brought to Sri Lanka from the empire of Asoka. Its title is abbreviated 'Dhs' in Pāli scholarship.

== Format ==
Following the matika, the main body of the book is in four parts, as follows.

- The first part deals with states of mind, listing and defining factors present in them.
- The second deals with material phenomena, classifying them numerically, by ones, twos etc.
- The third part applies the material in the first two to explaining the classifications in the matika.
- The fourth does likewise, but in a different and sometimes more detailed way, and omitting the sutta method 2-fold classifications. This fourth part is mostly omitted from the old translation, only a few extracts being included. The new translation is complete.

Rhys Davids (1900) divisions of the text are as follows:

Book I. The Genesis of Thoughts (cittuppaada- ka.n.da.m)	Part I. Good States of Consciousness	Ch. I. The Eight Main Types of Thought relating to the Sensuous Universe (kaamaavacara-a.t.tha-mahaacittaani); Ch. II. Good in relation to the Universe of Form (ruupaavacara-kusala.m); Ch. III. Good in relation to the Universe of the Formless (aruupaavacara-kusala.m); Ch. IV. Degrees of Efficacy in Good relating to the Three Realms; Ch. V. Thought engaged upon the Higher Ideal (lokuttaram citta.m)
Book I. The Genesis of Thoughts (cittuppaada- ka.n.da.m)	Part II. Bad States of Consciousness	Ch. VI. The Twelve Bad Thoughts (dvaadasa akusalacittaani)
Book I. The Genesis of Thoughts (cittuppaada- ka.n.da.m)	Part III. Indeterminate States of Consciousness	Ch. I. On Effect, or Result (vipaako): A. Good Karma. B. Bad Karma; Ch. II. Action-thoughts (kiriyaa)
Book II. Form (ruupa- ka.n.da.m)	[No parts]	Ch. I. Exposition of Form under Single Concepts (ekaka-niddeso); Ch. II. Categories of Form under Dual Aspects — positive and negative Ch. III. Categories of Form under Triple Aspects; Ch. IV. Categories of Form under Fourfold Aspects; Ch. V. Category of Form under a Fivefold Aspect; Ch. VI. Category of Form under a Sixfold Aspect; Ch. VII. Category of Form under a Sevenfold Aspect; Ch. VIII. Category of Form under an Eightfold Aspect; Ch. IX. Category of Form under a Ninefold Aspect; Ch. X. Category of Form under a Tenfold Aspect; Ch. XI. Category of Form under an Elevenfold Aspect
Book III. The Division; Entitled 'Elimination' (nikkhepa- ka.n.da.m)	Part I. [No title]	Ch. I. The Group of Triplets (tika.m); Ch. II. The Group on Cause (hetu-gocchaka.m); Ch. III. The Short Intermediate Set of Pairs (cuulantara-duka.m); Ch. IV. The Intoxicant Group (aasava-gocchaka.m); Ch. V. The Group of the Fetters (sa~n~nojana-gocchaka.m); Ch. VI. The Group of the Ties (gantha-gocchaka.m); Ch. VII. The Group of the Floods (ogha-gocchaka.m); Ch. VIII. The Group of the Bonds (yoga-gocchaka.m); Ch. IX. The Group of the Hindrances (niivarana-gocchaka.m); Ch. X. The Group on Contagion (paraamaasa-gocchaka.m); Ch. XI. The Great Intermediate Set of Pairs (mahantara-duka.m); Ch. XII. The Group on Grasping (upaadaana-gocchaka.m); Ch. XIII. The Group on the Corruptions (kilesa-gocchaka.m); Ch. XIV. The Supplementary Set of Pairs (pi.t.thiduka.m)
Book III. The Division; Entitled 'Elimination' (nikkhepa- ka.n.da.m)	Part II. The Suttanta; Pairs of Terms (suttantika-duka.m)	[No chapter titles]

== Translations ==
Several English translations are available, including:

- The Dhammasangani, edited by Edward Müller, 1885, published for the Pali Text Society, by H. Frowde in London
- A Buddhist Manual of Psychological Ethics, tr C. A. F. Rhys Davids, Royal Asiatic Society, 1900; reprinted with corrections, Pali Text Society, Bristol
- Dhammasaṅgaṇī: Enumeration of the Ultimate Realities, tr U Kyaw Khine, Department for the Promotion and Propagation of the Sasana, Rangoon, ?1996; reprinted by Sri Satguru Pubns, Delhi, 2 volumes

== See also ==
- Atthasālinī
