= Raga (Sanskrit term) =

Hindu and Buddhist concept

Translations of raga
- English: greed, sensuality, desire, attachment or excitement for sensory objects, lust, sexual desire, passion
- Sanskrit: राग (rāga)
- Pali: රාග (rāga)
- Assamese: ৰাগ (rāg)
- Burmese: လောဘ (ရာဂ)
- Chinese: 貪 (T) / 贪 (S) (Pinyin: tān)
- Japanese: 貪 (Rōmaji: ton)
- Khmer: រាគៈ, រាគ, លោភៈ, លោភ (UNGEGN: Réakeăk, Réak, Loŭpheăk, Loŭp)
- Korean: 탐 (RR: tam)
- Tibetan: འདོད་ཆགས་ (Wylie: ‘dod chags; THL: döchak)
- Thai: ราคะ (RTGS: rakha)
- Vietnamese: Tham 貪

Raga (Sanskrit: राग, IAST: rāga; Pali rāga; Tibetan: 'dod chags) is a Buddhist and Hindu concept of character affliction or poison referring to any form of "greed, sensuality, lust, desire" or "attachment to a sensory object". Raga is represented in Buddhist artwork (Sanskrit: bhāvacakra) by a bird - usually a cock. In Hinduism, it is one of the five Kleshas or poisons that afflict the soul. In Buddhism, Raga is identified in the following contexts:

- One of the three poisons within the Mahayana Buddhist tradition
- One of the three unwholesome roots, called lobha, within the Theravada Buddhist tradition
- One of the six root kleshas within the Mahayana Abhidharma teachings
- One of the fourteen unwholesome mental factors, called lobha, within the Theravada Abhidharma teachings

== Definitions ==
Rāga literally means 'color or hue' in Sanskrit. In Buddhist texts as a form of blemish, personal impurity or fundamental character affliction. The term Raga also refers to a melodic mode in Indian music.

== In Buddhism ==
As a Buddhist philosophical concept, the term refers to 'greed, sensuality, desire' or 'attachment to a sensory object'. It includes any form of desire including sexual desire and sensual passion, as well as attachments to, excitement over and pleasure derived from objects of the senses. Some scholars render it as 'craving'.

Raga is one of three poisons and afflictions, also called the "threefold fires" in Buddhist Pali canon, that prevents a being from reaching nirvana. To extinguish all raga (greed, lust, desire, attachment) is one of the requirements of nirvana (liberation) in Buddhism.

The Abhidharma-samuccaya states:

What is craving (raga)? It is attachment to the three realms of existence. Its function consists of engendering suffering.

Raga is said to arise from the identification of the self as being separate from everything else. This mis-perception or misunderstanding is referred to as avidya (ignorance).

== In Hinduism ==
In the Yoga Sutras II.7, rāga is defined as the desire for pleasure based on remembering past experiences of pleasure. Memory triggers the wish to repeat those experiences, leading to attachment. Ego is seen as the root of this attachment, and memory is necessary for attachment to form. Even when not consciously remembered, past impressions can unconsciously draw the mind toward objects of pleasure.

The word rāga also appears in a different sense in Yoga Sutra IV.17, with the prefix upa, as upa-rāga, meaning "being colored". In this verse, Patanjali explains how objects become known or unknown based on their interaction with the mind (citta).

== See also ==
- Karma in Buddhism
- Saṅkhāra
- Taṇhā
- Three poisons

== Sources ==
- Ajahn Sucitto (2010). Turning the Wheel of Truth: Commentary on the Buddha's First Teaching. Shambhala.
- Bryant, Edwin F. (2009). The Yoga sūtras of Patañjali: a new edition, translation, and commentary with insights from the traditional commentators (1st ed.). New York: North Point Press. pp. 189–190. ISBN 978-0-86547-736-0. OCLC 243544645.
- Goleman, Daniel (2008). Destructive Emotions: A Scientific Dialogue with the Dalai Lama. Bantam. Kindle Edition.
- Guenther, Herbert V. & Leslie S. Kawamura (1975), Mind in Buddhist Psychology: A Translation of Ye-shes rgyal-mtshan's "The Necklace of Clear Understanding" Dharma Publishing. Kindle Edition.
- Kunsang, Erik Pema (translator) (2004). Gateway to Knowledge, Vol. 1. North Atlantic Books.
- Leifer, Ron (1997). The Happiness Project. Snow Lion.
- Ringu Tulku (2005). Daring Steps Toward Fearlessness: The Three Vehicles of Tibetan Buddhism, Snow Lion.
