= Dvesha =

Hindu and Buddhist concept of hatred and aversion

Translations of Dvesha
- English: hatred, aversion, anger, hostility, ill will
- Sanskrit: dveṣa (Dev: द्वेष)
- Pali: dosa (𑀤𑁄𑀲)
- Burmese: ဒေါသ
- Chinese: 瞋(T) / 瞋(S) (Pinyin: chēn)
- Indonesian: kebencian
- Japanese: 瞋 (Rōmaji: shin)
- Khmer: ទោសៈ, ទោស (UNGEGN: Toŭsăk, Toŭh)
- Korean: 진 (RR: jin)
- Tibetan: ཞེ་སྡང (Wylie: zhe sdang; THL: shyédang)
- Thai: โทสะ
- Vietnamese: Sân 瞋

Dvesha (Sanskrit: द्वेष, IAST: dveṣa; Pali: 𑀤𑁄𑀲, romanized: dosa; Tibetan: zhe sdang) is a Buddhist and Hindu term that is translated as "hate, aversion". In Hinduism, it is one of the Five Poisons or kleshas. Walpola Rahula translated it as "hatred", as did Chögyam Trungpa.

== In Buddhism ==
In Buddhism, Dvesha (hate, aversion) is the opposite of raga (lust, desire). Along with Raga and Moha, Dvesha is one of the three character afflictions that, in part, cause dukkha. It is also one of the "threefold fires" in Buddhist Pali canon that must be quenched. Dvesha is symbolically present as the snake in the center of Tibetan bhavacakra drawings. Dvesha (Pali: dosa) is identified in the following contexts within the Buddhist teachings:

- One of the three poisons (trivisah) within the Mahayana Buddhist tradition.
- One of the three unwholesome roots within the Theravada Buddhist tradition
- One of the fourteen unwholesome mental factors within the Theravada Abhidharma teachings

Advesha or adveṣa (Sanskrit; Pali: 𑀅𑀤𑁄𑀲, romanized: adosa; Tibetan Wylie: zhes sdang med pa) is a Buddhist term translated as "non-aggression" or "non-hatred". It is defined as the absence of an aggressive attitude towards someone or something that causes pain. It is one of the mental factors within the Abhidharma teachings. The Abhidharma-samuccaya states:

What is advesha? It is the absence of the intention to harm sentient beings, to quarrel with frustrating situations, and to inflict suffering on those who are the cause of frustration. It functions as a basis for not getting involved with unwholesome behavior.

== In Hinduism ==
Yoga Sutras II.8 describes dvesha (aversion) as originating from encounters with pain. In his commentary, Vyasa explains that aversion manifests as resistance, anger, frustration, or resentment toward anything associated with past painful experiences. Aversion is also closely related to attachment, as both are rooted in past experiences.

== See also ==
- Kleshas (Buddhism)
- Mental factors (Buddhism)
- Taṇhā

== Sources ==
- Bhikkhu Bodhi (2003), A Comprehensive Manual of Abhidhamma, Pariyatti Publishing
- Goleman, Daniel (2008). Destructive Emotions: A Scientific Dialogue with the Dalai Lama. Bantam. Kindle Edition.
- Geshe Tashi Tsering (2006). Buddhist Psychology: The Foundation of Buddhist Thought. Perseus Books Group. Kindle Edition.
- Guenther, Herbert V. & Leslie S. Kawamura (1975), Mind in Buddhist Psychology: A Translation of Ye-shes rgyal-mtshan's "The Necklace of Clear Understanding". Dharma Publishing. Kindle Edition.
- Kunsang, Erik Pema (translator) (2004). Gateway to Knowledge, Vol. 1. North Atlantic Books.
