= Atthasālinī =

Buddhist text composed by Buddhaghosa

- OpenTipitaka
- Type: Commentarial text
- Parent: Aṭṭhakathā
- Commentary on: Dhammasaṅgaṇī
- Composition: c. 5th century
- Attribution: Buddhaghosa
- Abbreviation: As

Atthasālinī (Pali; lit. "Expositor of Meaning"), also known as the Dhammasaṅgaṇī-aṭṭhakathā, is one of the Theravadin Buddhist commentaries (Atthakatha) on the Dhammasangani, the first book of the Abhidhamma Pitaka. It was composed by Buddhaghosa, based on a Sinhalese commentary known as the Mahāpaccarī. The title has been translated as "The Expositor" or "Providing the Meaning".

In addition to explaining technical terminology of Buddhist psychology—such as cetasika (mental factors), rūpa (matter), and nibbāna—the Atthasālinī also preserves information on history, geography, and doctrinal interpretation. It is widely studied among Abhidhamma students and is one of Buddhaghosa’s most well-known works.

== Authorship ==
In the colophon of the text it is clearly stated that Buddhaghosa composed the work. According to his biography, while residing at the monastery of his teacher Revata, Buddhaghosa first composed the Ñānodaya and then intended to write the Atthasālinī on the Dhammasangani as well as commentaries on the Paritta. Revata, however, advised him to travel to Sri Lanka to consult the Sinhalese commentaries that had been composed by Mahinda and other elders based on the original recitations of the Councils.

Buddhaghosa then went to Sri Lanka and retranslated the old Sinhalese commentaries—originally rendered from Pali into Sinhalese—back into Pali. This suggests the Atthasālinī may have been begun in India but completed in Sri Lanka. Scholars indicate it was composed after the Samantapāsādikā, which was compiled c. 384–430 CE in Anuradhapura, Sri Lanka.

== Content ==
The content of the Atthasālinī is both doctrinal and encyclopedic. It expands on the Abhidhamma Pitaka with elaborate explanations and contextual discussions.

=== Mental factors ===
Within the Atthasālinī, Buddhaghosa systematically explains the fifty-two mental factors (Pali: cetasikas) listed in the Dhammasangani.

=== Doctrinal significance ===
The commentary defines and classifies dhammas comprehensively. It presents discussions on resultant consciousness (vipākacitta) according to different elders (in the Cittuppādakaṇḍa), and cites descriptions of the mind’s nature from texts such as the Milindapañha attributed to Nāgasena.

For example, it defines citta ("mind") as that which cognizes objects, comparing it to a city-guard who examines those who enter and recognizes whether they are local or foreign.

It also explains bodily, verbal, and mental actions. For instance, an intention to kill deer that is not carried out is not yet bodily action (kāyakamma), but is still described as unwholesome mental misconduct (kāyaduccarita).

=== Encyclopedic information ===
The text also records the history of Abhidhamma transmission, historical figures (e.g. Āḷāra Kālāma, Ajita, Kondañña, King Duṭṭhagāmaṇī, Mahinda, Nāgasena, Dīpaṅkara Buddha, Vipassī Buddha, Queen Mallikā, Sujātā), and geographic details such as rivers (Aciravatī, Gaṅgā, Godhāvarī, Nerañjarā, Mahī, Sarabhū, Anomā) and places (Kāsi, Kosala, Isipatana, Jambudīpa, Jetavana, Tambapaṇṇi, Pāṭaliputta, Rājagaha, Sāketa, Sāvatthi).

== Related works ==
The Atthasālinī was translated into various languages in Theravāda Buddhist countries. In the 17th century CE, Manirathana Thera translated it into Burmese.

Later sub-commentaries include:

- Līnatthajotanā – a sub-commentary (ṭīkā) on the Dhammasangani by Ānanda of Sri Lanka.
- Līnatthapakāsinī – an anuṭīkā (sub-sub-commentary) by Ānanda of Sri Lanka.
- Atthasālinī-aṭṭhayojanā – a yojana (further commentary) by Ñāṇakitti Thera in Chiang Mai, Lan Na, c. 1485–1500 CE.
- Kuyhattadīpanī – a kaṇṭhī (concise treatise) on the Dhammasangani by Sāradasī.

== Translations ==
- Buddhaghosa; tr. Pe Maung Tin (1958), The Expositor, Pali Text Society

== Bibliography ==
- Bimala Charan Law. (1923). The Life and Work of Buddhaghosa. Calcutta: Thacker, Spink & Co.
- Rohan L. Jayetilleke. (2007). Shwedagon Pagoda: The Icon of Theravada Buddhism. Budusarana. The Associated Newspapers of Ceylon Ltd.
- คณาจารย์มหาวิทยาลัยมหาจุฬาลงกรณราชวิทยาลัย. (2007). วรรณคดีบาลี. Bangkok: Mahachulalongkornrajavidyalaya University Press.
- พระมหาอดิศร ถิรสีโล. (2000). ประวัติคัมภีร์บาลี. Bangkok: Mahamakut Rajavidyalaya Press.
- พระพุทธโฆสะเถระ. สมเด็จพระพุฒาจารย์ (อาจ อาสภมหาเถร), tr. & comp. (2011). Visuddhimagga (Complete Edition). Bangkok: Wat Mahathat.
- ธีรวัส บำเพ็ญบุญบารมี. ประวัติพระพุทธโฆษาจารย์. Buddhist Canon Preservation Project.
- พระไตรปิฎกฉบับมหามกุฏราชวิทยาลัย. Atthasālinī Commentary on the Dhammasangani. Vol. 1 (Part 1 & 2).

== Sources ==
- Gethin, Rupert (1998), Foundations of Buddhism, Oxford University Press
- van Gorkom, Nina (2010), Cetisikas, Zolag
