= Erik Pema Kunsang =

Danish translator

Erik Pema Kunsang (born Erik Hein Schmidt) is a Danish Dharma teacher and translator. He was, along with Marcia Binder Schmidt, director of Rangjung Yeshe Translations and Publications in Kathmandu. He has translated over fifty volumes of Tibetan texts and oral teachings. Erik has been the assistant and translator for Tulku Urgyen Rinpoche and his sons since the late 1970s. He was active in facilitating masters of the Practice Lineages to teach in the West.

Erik Pema Kunsang is currently the resident teacher at the buddhist retreat center, Rangjung Yeshe Gomde Denmark. He teaches widely at Gomde and online, especially within the Bodhi Training program.

Within Bodhi Translations, Erik Pema Kunsang leads the translation of Tantric Sadhanas from tibetan to chantable English. Erik translates in meter, so that tantric rituals can be practiced by individuals and groups, while chanting in English.

Other former projects include the Rangjung Yeshe Wiki, an ongoing electronic publication that is compiling an extensive glossary of Buddhist terminology to bridge the Tibetan and English languages.
