= Abhidharma-samuccaya =

Buddhist text

Translations of Abhidharma-samuccaya
- English: Compendium of Abhidharma
- Sanskrit: Abhidharma-samuccaya
- Chinese: 大乘阿毘達磨集論(T) 大乘阿毗达磨集论(S)
- Japanese: 大乗阿毘達磨集論
- Korean: 대승아비달마집론 (RR: Daeseung-abidalma-jiplon)
- Tibetan: མངོན་པ་ཀུན་བཏུས་ (Wylie: mngon pa kun btus; THL: ngönpa küntü)
- Vietnamese: Đại Thừa A Tỳ Đạt Ma Tập Luận

The Abhidharma-samuccaya (Sanskrit; Wylie: mngon pa kun btus; English: "Compendium of Abhidharma") is a Buddhist text composed by Asaṅga. The Abhidharma-samuccaya is a systematic account of Abhidharma. According to J. W. de Jong it is also "one of the most important texts of the Yogācāra school." According to Frauwallner, this text is based on the Abhidharma of the Mahīśāsaka tradition.

The text exists in Chinese, Tibetan and a reconstructed Sanskrit version. Its Taishō Tripiṭaka (Chinese Canon) number is 1605. In the Tibetan Tengyur, it is number 4049 in the Derge Tengyur and 5550 in the Peking Kangyur.

According to Traleg Rinpoche, the Abhidharma-samuccaya is one of Asanga's most essential texts and also one of the most psychologically oriented. It provides a framework, as well as a general pattern, as to how a practitioner is to follow the path, develop oneself and finally attain Buddhahood. It presents the path according to the Yogācāra school of Mahayana Buddhism.

== Overview ==
According to de Jong, "whilst the Mahāyānasaṃgraha is a compendium of specifically Māhāyanist teachings of the Yogācara school, the Samuccaya is a systematic guide to the Abhidharma section of the doctrinal system of the said school." According to Dan Lusthaus, Asaṅga, "was primarily an Agamist, i.e., one who based himself on the āgamas. This text served as his overview of abhidharma from his developing Yogacaric perspective."

The Abhidharmasamuccaya survives in full Chinese (by Xuanzang) and Tibetan translations (by Yeshe de). About two fifths of the Sanskrit text was recovered in Tibet by Rāhula Saṅkṛtyayana in 1934 and Pralhad Pradhan produced a reconstructed Sanskrit version of the full text in 1950 (basing himself on the Sanskrit material as well as the Chinese and Tibetan translations). Walpola Rahula translated this reconstruction into French in 1971.

Contemporary scholar Achim Bayer asserts that different sections of the Abhidharma-samuccaya might be heterogenous. For example, the important term ālayavijñāna ("Store-house Consciousnesses") appears not more than six times, with all six occurrences in the "Lakṣaṇasamuccaya" section, i.e. in the first third of the work.

According to Walpola Rahula the Abhidharmasamuccaya is more faithful to the presentation of the dhyānas found in the suttas than the Theravada Abhidhamma texts.

=== Mental factors ===
The second chapter of this text enumerates fifty-one mental factors (Sanskrit: caitasikā), divided into the following categories:

- five ever-functioning factors (Wylie: kun 'gro lnga, 遍行心所, Korean: 변행심소),
- five ascertaining (object-determining) ones (yul nges lnga, 別境心所, Korean: 별경심소),
- eleven virtuous (or constructive) emotions (dge ba bcu gcig, 善心所, Korean: 선심소),
- six root disturbing emotions and attitudes (rtsa nyon drug, 煩惱心所, Korean: 번뇌심소),
- twenty auxiliary disturbing emotions (nye nyon nyi shu, 隨煩惱心所, Korean: 수번뇌심소),
- four changeable factors (gzhan 'gyur bzhi, 不定心所, Korean: 부정심소).

== Commentaries ==
There are various commentaries to this text, including:

- Abhidharmasamuccayabhāṣya. The full Sanskrit manuscript was re-discovered and photographed by Rāhula Saṅkṛtyayana. A critical edition, edited by Nathmal Tatia, was published in 1976. It also exists in a Tibetan translation. The Tibetan canon attributes this text to Jinaputra, while the Chinese canon attributes it to a certain Chueh Shih tsu (Buddhasiṃha?).
- Abhidharmasamuccayavyākhyā (which is a combination of the Abhidharmasamuccaya and its bhāṣya). It exists in Tibetan translation and in Chinese translation (Dasheng apidamo zaji lun 大乘阿毘達磨雜集論). The Tibetan canon attributes this text to Jinaputra, while the Chinese canon attributes it to Sthiramati.
- K'uei-chi wrote a sub-commentary to Xuanzang's translation of the Abhidharmasamuccayavyākhyā.
- A Tibetan commentary by Bu-ston (1290–1364).
- A Tibetan commentary by Gyaltsab Je (1364-1432).
- A Tibetan commentary by Sabzang Mati Panchen Jamyang Lodrö (1294-1376).

== Sources ==
- Bayer, Achim (2010). The Theory of Karman in the Abhidharmasamuccaya. Tokyo: International Institute for Buddhist Studies.
- Berzin, Alexander (2006). Primary Minds and the 51 Mental Factors. Study Buddhism.
- Traleg Rinpoche (1993). The Abhidharmasamuccaya: Teachings by the Venerable Traleg Kyabgon Rinpoche. The Kagyu E-Vam Buddhist Institute.
- Multilingual edition of the first chapter of Abhidharmasamuccaya in the Bibliotheca Polyglotta
- Asanga; Boin-Webb, Sara; Rahula, Walpola (2001). Abhidharmasamuccaya: The Compendium of the Higher Teaching (Philosophy), Asian Humanities Press.
- Dan Martin. Gray Traces: Tracing the Tibetan Teaching Transmission of the mNgon pa kun btus (Abhidharmasamuccaya) Through the Early Period of Disunity' in Helmut Eimer and David Germano (ed.), The Many Canons of Tibetan Buddhism, Leiden: Brill, 2002
