= THL Simplified Phonetic Transcription =

Tibetan romanization method

The THL Simplified Phonetic Transcription of Standard Tibetan (or THL Phonetic Transcription for short) is a system for the phonetic rendering of the Tibetan language.

It was created by David Germano and Nicolas Tournadre and was published on 12 December 2003. It is essentially a simplified form of the Tournadre Phonetic System, which is used by Tournadre in his Tibetan-language textbooks.

THL (formerly THDL) stands for the "Tibetan and Himalayan Library" project, which is hosted at the University of Virginia.

== Overview ==
=== Onsets ===
IPA	Wylie transliteration	Tibetan pinyin	THL
pá	p, sp, dp, lp	b	p
pà	rb, sb, sbr	b	b
mpà	lb, 'b	b	b
pʰá	ph, 'ph	p	p
pʰà	b	p	b
bà	bh	bh	bh
má	rm, sm, dm, smr	m	m
mà	m, mr	m	m
wà	db, b, w	w	w
tá	t, rt, lt, st, tw, gt, bt, brt, blt, bst, bld	d	t
tà	rd, sd, gd, bd, brd, bsd	d	d
ntá	lth	d	
ntà	zl, bzl, ld, md, 'd	d	d
tʰá	th, mth, 'th	t	t
tʰà	d, dw	t	d
ná	rn, sn, gn, brn, bsn, mn	n	n
nà	n	n	n
lá	kl, gl, bl, rl, sl, brl, bsl	l	l
là	l, lw	l	l
l̥á	lh	lh	lh
tsá	ts, rts, sts, rtsw, stsw, gts, bts, brts, bsts	z	ts
tsà	rdz, gdz, brdz	z	dz
ntsà	mdz, 'dz	z	dz
tsʰá	tsh, tshw, mtsh, 'tsh	c	ts
tsʰà	dz	c	dz
sá	s, sr, sw, gs, bs, bsr	s	s
sà	z, zw, gz, bz	s	z
ʈʂá	kr, rkr, lkr, skr, tr, pr, lpr, spr, dkr, dpr, bkr, bskr, bsr	zh	tr
ʈʂà	rgr, lgr, sgr, dgr, dbr, bsgr, rbr, lbr, sbr	zh	dr
ɳʈʂà	mgr, 'gr, 'dr, 'br	zh	dr
ʈʂʰá	khr, thr, phr, mkhr, 'khr, 'phr	ch	tr
ʈʂʰà	gr, dr, br, grw	ch	dr
ʂá	hr	sh	hr
rà	r, rw	r	r
r̥á	rh	rh	
cá	ky, rky, lky, sky, dky, bky, brky, bsky	gy	ky
cà	rgy, lgy, sgy, dgy, bgy, brgy, bsgy	gy	gy
ɲcà	mgy, 'gy	gy	gy
cʰá	khy, mkhy, 'khy	ky	khy
cʰà	gy	ky	gy
çá	hy	hy	hy
tɕá	c, cw, gc, bc, lc, py, lpy, spy, dpy	j	ch
tɕà	rby, lby, sby, rj, gj, brj	j	j
ɲtɕà	lj, mj, 'j, 'by	j	j
tɕʰá	ch, mch, 'ch, phy, 'phy	q	ch
tɕʰà	j, by	q	j
ɕá	sh, shw, gsh, bsh	x	sh
ɕà	zh, zhw, gzh, bzh	x	zh
ɲá	rny, sny, gny, brny, bsny, mny, nyw, rmy, smy	ny	ny
ɲà	ny, my	ny	ny
já	g.y	y	y
jà	y, dby	y	y
ká	k, rk, lk, sk, kw, dk, bk, brk, bsk	g	k
kà	rg, lg, sg, dg, bg, brg, bsg	g	g
ŋkà	lg, mg, 'g	g	g
kʰá	kh, khw, mkh, 'kh	k	kh
kʰà	g, gw	k	g
ŋá	rng, lng, sng, dng, brng, bsng, mng	ng	ng
ŋà	ng	ng	ng
ʔá	—, db	—	—
ʔ̞à	'	—	—
há	h, hw	h	h

=== Vowels ===
IPA	THL	IPA	THL
i	i	ĩ	in
e	é	ẽ	én
ɛ	e/é	ɛ̃	en/én
a	a	ã	an
u	u	ũ	un
o	o	õ	on
ɔ	o	ɔ̃	on
y	ü	ỹ	ün
ø	ö	ø̃	ön
