= Sammādiṭṭhi Sutta =

9th Sutta in the Majjhima Nikaya, Pāli Canon

The Sammādiṭṭhi Sutta (Pali for "Right View Discourse") is the 9th discourse in Majjhima Nikaya of Pāli Canon that provides an elaboration on the Buddhist notion of "right view" by the Buddha's chief disciple, Ven. Sariputta. The Chinese canon contains two corresponding translations, the Maha Kotthita Sutra (大拘絺羅經) and the Kotthita Sutra (拘絺羅經).

Right view is the first factor of the Buddhist Noble Eightfold Path, the path that leads to the cessation of suffering. Right view is considered the "forerunner" of all other path factors. Historically, this particular discourse has been used as a primer for monks in South and Southeast Asian monasteries and is read aloud monthly in some Mahayana monasteries.

In the Pali Canon, the Sammaditthi Sutta is the ninth discourse in the Majjhima Nikaya ("Middle-length Collection," abbreviated as either "MN" or "M") and is designated by either "MN 9" or "M.1.1.9" or "M i 46". In the Chinese canon, the Maha Kotthita Sutra (大拘絺羅經) is found in the Taisho Tripitaka Vol. 1, No. 26, page 461, sutra 29 and the Kotthita Sutra (拘絺羅經) is found in the Taisho Tripitaka Vol. 2, No. 99, page 94, sutra 344.

== Text ==
In this discourse, Ven. Sariputta addresses a congregation of monks (bhikkhu) about how (in English and Pali):

... ariyasāvako sammādiṭṭhi hoti.
Ujugatāssa diṭṭhi.
Dhamme aveccappasādena samannāgato
āgato imaṃ saddhammanti.

Translation:

"... a noble disciple is one of right view,
whose view is straight,
who has perfect confidence in the Dhamma,
and has arrived at this true Dhamma."

At the monks' repeated urging, Ven. Sariputta then identifies the following sixteen cases (pariyāya) through which a noble disciple could achieve right view:

- the Unwholesome and the Wholesome
- Nutriments
- the Four Noble Truths (discussed as one case)
- the twelve causes (nidana) of Dependent Origination (discussed as twelve individual cases)
- the Taints

Right view is achieved for the last fifteen of these cases by understanding (pajānāti) the four phases of each case:

- the constituents of the case
- its origin
- its cessation
- the way leading to its cessation

=== Unwholesome and wholesome ===
Ven. Sariputta describes the "unwholesome" (akusala) as entailing ten different actions of three different types:

- physical actions: killing (pāṇātipāto), stealing (adinnādānaṃ) and sexual misconduct (kāmesumicchācāro);
- verbal actions: lying (musāvādo), divisive speech (pisuṇāvācā), harsh speech (pharusāvācā) and idle chatter (samphappalāpo);
- mental actions: covetousness (abhijjhā), ill will (byāpādo) and wrong view (micchādiṭṭhi).

The "root of the unwholesome" (akusalamūla) is threefold:

- greed (lobho)
- hatred (doso)
- delusion (moho)

The wholesome (kusala) entails abstention (veramaṇī) from the aforementioned unwholesome physical and verbal acts as well as non-covetousness (anabhijjhā), non-ill will (abyāpādo) and right view (sammādiṭṭhi). The wholesome's root (kusalamūla) is nongreed (alobho), nonhatred (adoso) and nondelusion (amoho).

Understanding (pajānāti) these twenty actions and six roots, the noble disciple abandons greed, aversion, conceit and ignorance, arouses wisdom, ends suffering and is one of right view.

=== Nutriments ===
Ven. Sariputta describes the "nutriments" (āhāro) as fourfold:

- physical food (kabaliṅkāro)
- contact (phasso)
- mental volition (manosañcetanā)
- consciousness (viññāṇa)

The arising (origin) of nutriment is due to the arising of craving. The cessation of nutriment is the cessation of craving. The way leading to the cessation of nutriment is the Noble Eightfold Path. Understanding nutriment, its origin, cessation and the way leading to its cessation, the noble disciple abandons greed, aversion, conceit and ignorance, arouses wisdom, ends suffering and is one of right view.

=== Four noble truths ===
The 12 Nidānas:
Ignorance
↓
Formations
↓
Consciousness
↓
Name & Form
↓
Six Sense Bases
↓
Contact
↓
Feeling
↓
Craving
↓
Clinging
↓
Becoming
↓
Birth
↓
Old Age & Death

Ven. Sariputta describes the Four Noble Truths using traditional canonical phrases:

- suffering (dukkha) is birth, aging, sickness, death, ... in short, the five aggregates of clinging.
- the origin of suffering (dukkhasamudaya) is craving (tanha) ... for sensual pleasures, being and non-being.
- the cessation of suffering (dukkhanirodha) is ... the letting go and rejecting of craving.
- the way leading to the cessation of suffering (dukkhanirodhagāminī paṭipadā) is the Noble Eightfold Path (ariyo aṭṭhaṅgiko maggo).

Understanding suffering, its origin, cessation and the way leading to its cessation, the noble disciple abandons greed, aversion, conceit and ignorance, arouses wisdom, ends suffering and is one of right view.

=== Twelve causes ===
Ven. Sariputta then describes individually each of the twelve causes (represented in the sidebar to the right) of Dependent Origination using traditional canonical phrases, starting with "aging and death" (jaramarana) and regressing to "ignorance" (avijjā).

In this formulation, the next further back cause is the "origin" of the current cause. Thus, for instance, the origin of "aging and death" is "birth" (jati), the origin of "birth" is "becoming" (bhava), etc. Here, the origin of "ignorance" is the "taints" (āsava, see below). The cause's cessation is its temporal predecessor's cessation (for instance, old age and death cease when birth ceases). The way leading to the cessation of any of these twelve causes is the Noble Eightfold Path.

Understanding any one of these twelve causes, its origin, cessation and the way leading to its cessation, the noble disciple abandons greed, aversion, conceit and ignorance, arouses wisdom, ends suffering and is one of right view.

=== Taints ===
Naturally following through on his assertion that ignorance arises from the taints, Ven. Sariputta next enumerates the three taints (tayo āsava):

- the taint of sensual desire (kāmāsavo)
- the taint of being (bhavāsavo)
- the taint of ignorance (avijjāsavo)

The origin of the taints is in turn ignorance (avijjā).

Understanding the taints, their origin (ignorance), cessation (the cessation of ignorance) and the way leading to their cessation (the Noble Eightfold Path), the noble disciple abandons greed, aversion, conceit and ignorance, arouses wisdom, ends suffering and is one of right view.

Upon hearing this last case described, the monks were satisfied.

== Related canonical discourses ==
Throughout the Pali Canon, other discourses underline and amplify the topics discussed in this discourse. Below is a sample of such discourses regarding the definition of right view, wholesome and unwholesome actions, and the roots of greed, hate and delusion.

=== Magga-vibhanga Sutta (SN 45.8) ===
In the "An Analysis of the Path" discourse (SN 45.8), the Buddha is recorded as uttering a brief formula for defining "right view":

... dukkhe ñāṇaṃ
dukkhasamudaye ñāṇaṃ
dukkhanirodhe ñāṇaṃ
dukkhanirodhagāminiyā
paṭipadāya ñāṇaṃ....

Translation:

"Knowledge with regard to stress [dukkha],
knowledge with regard to the origination of stress,
knowledge with regard to the stopping of stress,
knowledge with regard to the way of practice
leading to the stopping of stress...."

This pithy phrase reflects the core process of the Sammaditthi Sutta insomuch that each of the discourse's cases is analyzed in terms of its existence, its origin, its cessation and the way leading to its cessation (that is, the Noble Eightfold Path).

This condensed formulaic definition of "right view" is found in other canonical discourses as well as in the Abhidhamma Pitaka. In addition, in the Pali literature, this same definition is provided for "wisdom" (vijjā), "non-delusion" (amoho), and the "four knowledges of this world" (aparāni cattāri ñāṇāni).

=== Saleyyaka Sutta (MN 41) ===
In "The Brahmans of Sala" discourse (MN 41), as elsewhere in the Canon, the Buddha elaborates in detail on the ten unwholesome and ten wholesome actions. For instance, regarding unwholesome mental actions, the Buddha is recorded as having stated:

"And how are there three kinds of mental conduct not in accordance with the Dhamma, unrighteous conduct? Here someone is covetous: he is a coveter of another's chattels and property thus: 'Oh, that what is another's were mine!' Or he has a mind of ill-will, with the intention of a mind affected by hate thus: 'May these beings be slain and slaughtered, may they be cut off, perish, or be annihilated!' Or he has wrong view, distorted vision, thus: 'There is nothing given, nothing offered, nothing sacrificed, no fruit and ripening of good and bad kammas [action], no this world, no other world, no mother, no father, no spontaneously (born) beings, no good and virtuous monks and brahmans that have themselves realized by direct knowledge and declare this world and the other world....'"

=== Mula Sutta (AN 3.69) ===
In the "Roots" discourse (AN 3.69), the Buddha describes the three roots of greed, hate (or aversion) and delusion in the following power-driven fashion:

"Greed itself is unskillful. Whatever a greedy person fabricates by means of body, speech, or intellect, that too is unskillful. Whatever suffering a greedy person – his mind overcome with greed, his mind consumed – wrongly inflicts on another person through beating or imprisonment or confiscation or placing blame or banishment, [with the thought,] 'I have power. I want power,' that too is unskillful. Thus it is that many evil, unskillful qualities/events – born of greed, caused by greed, originated through greed, conditioned by greed – come into play."

The same exact formula is used for "aversion" and "delusion" substituting these words for "greed."

Additionally, the Buddha describes how a person overcome with these roots has on-going problems:

"And a person like this is called one who speaks at the wrong time, speaks what is unfactual, speaks what is irrelevant, speaks contrary to the Dhamma, speaks contrary to the Vinaya.... When told what is factual, he denies it and doesn't acknowledge it. When told what is unfactual, he doesn't make an ardent effort to untangle it [to see], 'This is unfactual. This is baseless.'...

"A person like this – his mind overcome with evil, unskillful qualities born of greed... born of aversion... born of delusion, his mind consumed – dwells in suffering right in the here-&-now – feeling threatened, turbulent, feverish – and at the break-up of the body, after death, can expect a bad destination."

In juxtaposition, the person whose unwholesome roots are abandoned experiences present moment ease:

"In a person like this, evil, unskillful qualities born of greed... born of aversion... born of delusion have been abandoned, their root destroyed, like an uprooted palm tree, deprived of the conditions of existence, not destined for future arising. He dwells in ease right in the here-&-now – feeling unthreatened, placid, unfeverish – and is unbound right in the here-&-now."

== Post-canonical commentary ==
The traditional Pali commentary (atthakatha) to the Majjhima Nikaya is the Papañcasūdani (abbrev., Ps. or MA). It includes a line-by-line analysis of this discourse. Portions of this commentary can also be found in the Visuddhimagga. Both of these texts are attributed to Buddhaghosa.

=== Supramundane right view ===
- Persons of Right View (According to the Pali Commentary)
type of right view	type of person	understanding
mundane right view (lokiya)	"worldling" (puthujjana)	Buddhists & non-Buddhists	believes in one's own kamma
Buddhists only	does not hold to a "view of self"
supra- mundane right view (lokuttara)	disciple in higher training (sekha): stream-enterer, once-returner, non-returner	"fixed" right view
one beyond training (asekha): arahant	right view "beyond training"

The Papañcasūdani identifies different types of right view contingent on one's breadth and depth of understanding (see the adjacent table). According to this commentary, when Ven. Sariputta discusses one "who has perfect confidence in the Dhamma and has arrived at the true Dhamma," he is referring to one who has attained "supramundane right view," thus holding out this higher achievement as a milestone for his audience.

=== Understanding unwholesome and wholesome ===
According to the Pali commentary, the unwholesome and the wholesome can be understood within the four-phase framework (suffering-origin-cessation-path) used to analyze this discourse's other fifteen cases. From one perspective, the unwholesome and the wholesome are a form of suffering (dukkha). Likewise, their respective roots (greed, nongreed, etc.) are thus "the origin of suffering" (dukkha-samudaya); the non-arising of the roots is the cessation of this suffering (dukkha-nirodha); and, the understanding of unwholesome and wholesome actions and their roots, abandoning the roots, and understanding their cessation is the noble path (ariya-magga).

In addition, the ten courses of unwholesome action and ten courses of wholesome action can be understood in terms of the following five aspects: mental state (whether or not volition was a primary factor); category (result of prior action or roots or both); object (formation or beings); feeling (painful, pleasant or neutral); and, root (greed, hate and/or delusion).

=== Further description of the nutriments ===
In elaborating upon the nutriments, the commentary states:

- Physical food nourishes the materiality. Understanding this nutriment leads to understanding the lust for the five sense pleasures which fetter the noble disciple to rebirth.
- Contact nourishes the three types of feeling (pleasant, unpleasant and neutrality). Understanding this nutriment leads to understanding the three feelings.
- Mental volition nourishes the three kinds of being (sense-sphere, fine-material and immaterial beings). Understanding this nutriment leads to understanding the three cravings.
- Consciousness nourishes the mentality-materiality of "rebirth-linking." Understanding this nutriment leads to understanding mentality-materiality.

After understanding any of the three latter nutriments, "there is nothing further for the noble disciple to do."

=== Beginningless samsara ===
The commentary notes:

"Because with the arising of the taints there is the arising of ignorance, and with the arising of ignorance there is the arising of the taints. Thus the taints are a condition for ignorance, and ignorance is a condition for the taints. Having shown this, (it follows that) no first point of ignorance is manifest, and because none is manifest the undiscoverability of any beginning of samsara is proven."

=== Thirty-two explanations of Truth ===
As this discourse analyzes each of the sixteen cases in terms of the Four Noble Truths (that is, in terms of each case's definition, origin, cessation and the path leading to cessation) and that it provides a twofold analysis (in terms of a brief initial statement followed by a more detailed explanation), and that understanding each of these can lead to arahantship, the commentary concludes:

"Thus in the entire Word of the Buddha comprised in the five great Nikayas, there is no sutta except for this Discourse on Right View where the Four (Noble) Truths are explained thirty-two times and where arahantship is explained thirty-two times."

== See also ==
- Noble Eightfold Path
- Four Noble Truths
- Dependent Co-Arising
- Four stages of enlightenment

== Sources ==
- Bodhi, Bhikkhu (2005). In the Buddha's Words: An Anthology of Discourses from the Pali Canon. Boston: Wisdom Publications. ISBN 0-86171-491-1.
- La Trobe University (n.d.). Sammādiṭṭhisuttaṃ (M 1.1.9; in Pali). Retrieved 16 Sep 2007 from "Pali Canon Online Database" et seq. (BJT Pages 110–132).
- Ñanamoli Thera (tr.) (1981). Dhammacakkappavattana Sutta: Setting Rolling the Wheel of Truth (SN 56.11). Retrieved 20 Sep 2007 from "Access to Insight" (1993).
- Ñanamoli Thera (tr.) & Bhikkhu Bodhi (ed., rev.) (1991). The Discourse on Right View: The Sammaditthi Sutta and its Commentary (The Wheel Publication No. 377/379; includes translations of MN 9 and the associated commentary from the Papañcasudani). Kandy: Buddhist Publication Society. Retrieved 16 Sep 2007 from "Access to Insight" (1994).
- Ñaṇamoli Thera (tr.) & Bhikkhu Bodhi (ed., rev.) (1995, 2001). The Middle-Length Discourses of the Buddha: A Translation of the Majjhima Nikāya. Boston: Wisdom Publications. ISBN 0-86171-072-X.
- Ñanamoli Thera (tr.) & Bhikkhu Khantipalo (ed.) (1993). Saleyyaka Sutta: The Brahmans of Sala (MN 41). Retrieved 18 Sept 2007 from "Access to Insight" (1994).
- Rhys Davids, T.W. & William Stede (eds.) (1921–5). The Pali Text Society’s Pali–English Dictionary. Chipstead: Pali Text Society. A general on-line search engine for the PED is available at http://dsal.uchicago.edu/dictionaries/pali/.
- Thanissaro Bhikkhu (tr.) (1996). Magga-vibhanga Sutta: An Analysis of the Path (SN 45.8). Retrieved 17 Sep 2007 from "Access to Insight".
- Thanissaro Bhikkhu (tr.) (1997a). Maha-cattarisaka Sutta: The Great Forty (MN 117). Retrieved 16 Sep 2007 from "Access to Insight".
- Thanissaro Bhikkhu (tr.) (1997b). Paticca-samuppada-vibhanga Sutta: Analysis of Dependent Co-arising (SN 12.2). Retrieved 21 Sep 2007 from "Access to Insight".
- Thanissaro Bhikkhu (tr.) (2000). Maha-satipatthana Sutta: The Great Frames of Reference (DN 22). Retrieved 21 Sep 2007 from "Access to Insight".
- Thanissaro, Bhikkhu (tr.) (2005a). Mula Sutta: Roots (AN 3.69). Retrieved 20 Sep 2007 from "Access to Insight".
- Thanissaro, Bhikkhu (tr.) (2005b). Sammaditthi Sutta: Right View (MN 9). Retrieved 16 Sep 2007 from "Access to Insight".
