= Upajjhatthana Sutta =

Buddhist sutta

The Upajjhatthana Sutta ("Subjects for Contemplation"), also known as the Abhiṇhapaccavekkhitabbaṭhānasutta in the Chaṭṭha Saṅgāyana Tipiṭaka, is a Buddhist discourse (Pali: sutta; Skt.: sutra) famous for its inclusion of five remembrances, five facts regarding life's fragility and our true inheritance. The discourse advises that these facts are to be reflected upon often by all.

According to this discourse, contemplation of these facts leads to the abandonment of destructive attachments and actions and to the cultivation of factors necessary for Awakening. According to the Ariyapariyesana Sutta (Discourse on the Noble Quest) MN 26, the first three remembrances are the very insights that led Gautama Buddha to renounce his royal household status and become an ascetic after experiencing strong feelings of spiritual urgency (saṃvega).

As the 57th discourse of the fifth book of the Pali Canon's Anguttara Nikaya (AN), this discourse's abbreviated designation is AN 5.57 or AN V.57. Alternately, it may be designated as A iii 71 to signify that in the Pali Text Society's Anguttara Nikaya's third volume, this discourse starts on page 71.

== Five remembrances ==
Below are two English translations and the original Pali text of the "five remembrances":

1.	I am sure to become old; I cannot avoid aging.	I am subject to aging, have not gone beyond aging.	Jarādhammomhi jaraṃ anatīto....
2.	I am sure to become ill; I cannot avoid illness.	I am subject to illness, have not gone beyond illness.	Vyādhidhammomhi vyādhiṃ anatīto....
3.	I am sure to die; I cannot avoid death.	I am subject to death, have not gone beyond death.	Maraṇadhammomhi maraṇaṃ anatīto....
4.	I must be separated and parted from all that is dear and beloved to me.	I will grow different, separate from all that is dear and appealing to me.	Sabbehi me piyehi manāpehi nānābhāvo vinābhāvo....
5.	I am the owner of my actions, heir of my actions, actions are the womb (from which I have sprung), actions are my relations, actions are my protection. Whatever actions I do, good or bad, of these I shall become the heir.	I am the owner of my actions, heir to my actions, born of my actions, related through my actions, and have my actions as my arbitrator. Whatever I do, for good or for evil, to that will I fall heir.	Kammassakomhi kammadāyādo kammayoni kammabandhū kammapaṭisaraṇo yaṃ kammaṃ karissāmi kalyāṇaṃ vā pāpakaṃ vā tassa dāyādo bhavissāmī....

The Buddha advised: "These are the five facts that one should reflect on often, whether one is a woman or a man, lay or ordained."

Since the Buddha redefined kamma as intention in the Nibbedhika Sutta, intention or intentionally committed actions may be better translations of kamma in the last recollection.

== Rationale and contemplation ==
In this discourse, the Buddha explains that the rationale for contemplating (paccavekkhato) the first three facts is to weaken or overcome conceit (mada) in youth, in good health and in being alive; the fourth contemplation is to weaken or overcome lust (rāga); and, the fifth contemplation is to weaken or overcome irresponsibility embodied in improper (duccarita) acts, speech and thoughts. Thus, by contemplating these facts, the Noble Eightfold Path (anchored in right understanding, conduct and effort) is cultivated and spiritual fetters are abandoned.

One reflects upon (paṭisañcikkhati) each of these facts in the following manner:

I am not the only one who is sure to become old. ... But wherever beings come and go, pass away and re-arise, they all are subject to old age...

== Related canonical discourses ==
Two central Buddhist concepts highlighted in this discourse and echoed throughout Buddhist scriptures are: personal suffering (dukkha) associated with aging, illness and death; and, a natural ethical system based on mental, verbal and physical action (Pali: kamma; Skt.: karma).

=== Dhammacakkappavattana Sutta (SN 56.11) ===
In the Buddha's first discourse, Dhammacakkappavattana Sutta (SN 56.11), the Buddha is recorded as defining "suffering" (dukkha) in a manner that incorporates the first four remembrances: "Birth is suffering, aging is suffering, sickness is suffering, death is suffering, association with the unpleasant is suffering, dissociation from the pleasant is suffering, not to receive what one desires is suffering...." This formula is reiterated throughout the Pali Canon.

=== Sukumāla Sutta (AN 3.38) ===
The first three remembrances are antidotes to the "threefold pride" of youthfulness (yobbana-mada), health (ārogya-mada) and life (jīvita-mada). Nyanaponika & Bodhi (1999) note:

The first three contemplations commended serve to replicate, in the thoughtful disciple, the same awakening to the inescapable realities of the human condition that was thrust upon the future Buddha while he was still dwelling in the palace.

The Sukumāla Sutta (AN 3.38) illustrates the bodhisatta's early insights. For instance, in this discourse, the Buddha is recording as having observed:

...[T]he thought occurred to me: "When an untaught, run-of-the-mill person, himself subject to aging, not beyond aging, sees another who is aged, he is horrified, humiliated, & disgusted, oblivious to himself that he too is subject to aging, not beyond aging. If I – who am subject to aging, not beyond aging – were to be horrified, humiliated, & disgusted on seeing another person who is aged, that would not be fitting for me." As I noticed this, the [typical] young person's intoxication with youth entirely dropped away.

=== Devadūta Sutta (MN 130 & AN 3.36) ===
In the Devadūta Sutta (MN 130), King Yama, the righteous god of death, in judging a newly deceased person's destination, asks whether or not the person has seen and reflected upon five "divine messengers" (devadūta). These five are:

1. a newly born, defenseless infant
2. a bent over, broken-toothed old person (aging)
3. a suffering ill person (illness)
4. a punished criminal
5. a dead person (death)

Regarding each of these, Yama would query:

Good man, did it never occur to you – an intelligent and mature man – "I too am subject to ageing, I am not exempt from ageing: surely I had better do good by body, speech, and mind"? ...[T]his evil action of yours was not done by your mother or your father, or by your brother or your sister, or by your friends and companions, or by your kinsmen and relatives, or by recluses and brahmins, or by gods: this evil action was done by you yourself, and you yourself will experience its result.

In the similarly named sutta AN 3.36, Yama's interrogation is reduced to addressing the three universal conditions of aging, illness and death.

=== Dasadhamma Sutta (AN 10.48) ===
In the Dasadhamma Sutta (AN 10.48), the Buddha identifies "ten things" (dasa dhamma) that renunciates (pabbajita) should reflect on often:

1. "I have become casteless"
2. "My life is dependent on others"
3. "My behavior should be different [from that of householders]"
4. "Can I fault myself with regard to my virtue?"
5. "Can my knowledgeable fellows in the holy life, on close examination, fault me with regard to my virtue?"
6. "I will grow different, separate from all that is dear & appealing to me"
7. "I am the owner of my actions (kamma), heir to my actions, born of my actions, related through my actions, and have my actions as my arbitrator. Whatever I do, for good or for evil, to that will I fall heir"
8. "What am I becoming as the days & nights fly past?"
9. "Do I delight in an empty dwelling?"
10. "Have I attained a superior human attainment, a truly noble distinction of knowledge & vision, such that – when my fellows in the holy life question me in the last days of my life – I won't feel abashed?"

As can be readily seen, this list retains the fourth and fifth remembrances of the Upajjhatthana Sutta as its sixth and seventh contemplations.

=== Cula-kammavibhanga Sutta (MN 135) ===
In the Cula-kammavibhanga Sutta (MN 135), the Buddha is asked to elaborate on his statement:

... [B]eings are owners of kammas, heirs of kammas, they have kammas as their progenitor, kammas as their kin, kammas as their homing-place. It is kammas that differentiate beings according to inferiority and superiority.

The Buddha responds in the context of the Buddhist notion of rebirth. He identifies that killing or physically harming living beings, or being ill-tempered or envious or uncharitable to monastics or stubborn or uncurious about the teachings leads to inferior rebirths; while abstaining from these actions (kamma) leads to superior rebirths. The Buddha summarizes:

So ... the way that leads to short life [that is, killing others] makes people [oneself] short-lived [in ones next life], the way that leads to long life makes people long-lived; the way that leads to sickness makes people sick, the way that leads to health makes people healthy; the way that leads to ugliness makes people ugly, the way that leads to beauty makes people beautiful; the way that leads to insignificance makes people insignificant, the way that leads to influence makes people influential; the way that leads to poverty makes people poor, the way that leads to riches makes people rich; the way that leads to low birth makes people low-born, the way that leads to high birth makes people high-born; the way that leads to stupidity makes people stupid, the way that leads to wisdom makes people wise...

== Alternate titles ==
Some alternate titles for the Upajjhatthana Sutta are based on this discourse's opening words (in English and Pali):

There are these five facts that one should reflect on often, whether one is a woman or a man, lay or ordained.	Pañcimāni bhikkhave ṭhānāni abhiṇhaṃ paccavekkhitabbāni itthiyā vā purisena vā gahaṭṭhena vā pabbajitena vā.

Thus, based on the discourse's third Pali word, the Pali-language SLTP (n.d.) text simply refers to this discourse as the Ṭhānasuttaṃ. In general, ṭhāna (pl. ṭhānāni) can be translated as "abode" or "state" or "condition." In the above translation, Thanissaro (1997b) translates ṭhāna as "fact."

In addition, based on the discourse's fourth and fifth Pali words, the Pali-language Chaṭṭha Saṅgāyana edition is entitled, Abhiṇhapaccavekkhitabbānasuttaṃ. Upalavanna (n.d.) translates this into English as, "Should be constantly reflected upon."

Furthermore, Nyanaponika & Bodhi (1999) provide this discourse with the English-language title, "Five Contemplations for Everyone."

== See also ==
- Pāli Canon
- Sutta Piṭaka
- Anguttara Nikāya
- Majjhima Nikāya
- Samyutta Nikaya
- Dhammacakkappavattana Sutta
- Samaññaphala Sutta
- Four Noble Truths
- Noble Eightfold Path
- Patikulamanasikara
- Jarāmaraṇa
- Anussati

== Sources ==
- Bodhi, Bhikkhu (ed.) (2005). In the Buddha's Words: An Anthology of Discourses from the Pāli Canon. Boston: Wisdom Pubs. ISBN 0-86171-491-1.
- Bodhgaya News (n.d.). Pali Canon Online Database. Available at http://www.bodhgayanews.net/pali.htm.
- Ñanamoli Thera (trans.) (1994). Cula-kammavibhanga Sutta: The Shorter Exposition of Kamma (MN 135). Retrieved 31 Aug 2007 from "Access to Insight" at https://www.accesstoinsight.org/tipitaka/mn/mn.135.nymo.html.
- Ñāṇamoli, Bhikkhu (trans.) & Bhikkhu Bodhi (ed.) (2001). The Middle-Length Discourses of the Buddha: A Translation of the Majjhima Nikāya. Boston: Wisdom Publications. ISBN 0-86171-072-X.
- Nyanaponika Thera & Bhikkhu Bodhi (1999). Numerical Discourses of the Buddha: An Anthology of Suttas from the Anguttara Nikaya. Walnut Creek, CA: Altamira Press. ISBN 0-7425-0405-0.
- Piyadassi Thera (trans.) (1999). Dhammacakkappavattana Sutta: Setting in Motion the Wheel of Truth (SN 56.11). Retrieved 30 Aug 2007 from "Access to Insight" at https://www.accesstoinsight.org/tipitaka/sn/sn56/sn56.011.piya.html.
- Rhys Davids, T.W. & William Stede (eds.) (1921-5). The Pali Text Society’s Pali–English Dictionary. Chipstead: Pali Text Society. A general on-line search engine for the PED is available at https://dsal.uchicago.edu/dictionaries/pali/.
- Sri Lanka Tripitaka Project (SLTP) (n.d.). Nīvaraṇavaggo (AN 5.6). Retrieved 29 Aug 2007 from "MettaNet - Lanka" at http://www.metta.lk/tipitaka/2Sutta-Pitaka/4Anguttara-Nikaya/Anguttara3/5-pancakanipata/006-nivaranavaggo-p.html.
- Thanissaro Bhikkhu (trans.) (1994). Dasadhamma Sutta: Ten Things (AN 10.48). Retrieved 31 Aug 2007 from "Access to Insight" at https://www.accesstoinsight.org/tipitaka/an/an10/an10.048.than.html.
- Thanissaro Bhikkhu (trans.) (1997a). Sukhamala Sutta: Refinement (AN 3.38). Retrieved 29 Aug 2007 from "Access to Insight" at https://www.accesstoinsight.org/tipitaka/an/an03/an03.038.than.html.
- Thanissaro Bhikkhu (trans.) (1997b). Upajjhatthana Sutta: Subjects for Contemplation (AN 5.57). Retrieved 3 Oct 2006 from "Access to Insight" at https://www.accesstoinsight.org/tipitaka/an/an05/an05.057.than.html.
- Upalavanna, Sister (trans.) (n.d.). Nīvaranavaggo (AN 5:6). Retrieved 29 Aug 2007 from "MettaNet - Lanka" at http://www.metta.lk/tipitaka/2Sutta-Pitaka/4Anguttara-Nikaya/Anguttara3/5-pancakanipata/006-nivaranavaggo-e.html.
