= Six senses =

Six senses may refer to:

- Six senses (Buddhism)
- Six Senses, one of brands of IHG Hotels & Resorts

== See also ==
- Sixth Sense (disambiguation)
