= Rūpa =

Form of object in Indian philosophy

Translations of rūpa
- English: form, material object
- Sanskrit: रूप (rūpa)
- Pali: रूप (rūpa)
- Burmese: ရူပ (ruupa)
- Chinese: 色 (Pinyin: sè)
- Japanese: 色 (Rōmaji: shiki)
- Korean: 색 (RR: saek)
- Malay: rupa
- Sinhala: රෑප (rūpa)
- Tibetan: གཟུགས (gzugs)
- Thai: รูป
- Vietnamese: sắc (色)

Rūpa (Devanagari: रूप) means "form". As it relates to any kind of basic object, it has more specific meanings in the context of Indic religions.

== Definition ==
According to the Monier-Williams Dictionary (2006), rūpa is defined as:

- ... any outward appearance or phenomenon or colour (often pl.), form, shape, figure RV. &c &c ...
- to assume a form ; often ifc. = " having the form or appearance or colour of ", " formed or composed of ", " consisting of ", " like to " ....

== Hinduism ==
In Hinduism, many compound words are made using rūpa to describe subtle and spiritual realities such as the svarupa, meaning the form of the self. It may be used to express matter or material phenomena, especially that linked to the power of vision in samkhya, In the Bhagavad Gita, the Vishvarupa form, an esoteric conception of the Absolute is described.

== Buddhism ==
Figure 1:
The Five Aggregates (pañcakkhandha)
according to the Pali Canon.

form (rūpa)
4 elements (mahābhūta)
	↓
	contact (phassa)
↓	↑
consciousness (viññāna)

→
←

←

mental factors (cetasika)
feeling (vedanā)
perception (sañña)
formation (saṅkhāra)

- Form is derived from the Four Great Elements.
- Consciousness arises from other aggregates.
- Mental Factors arise from the Contact of
  Consciousness and other aggregates.
- The five aggregates are no-self.

Source: MN 109 (Thanissaro, 2001) | diagram details

Figure 2: The Pali Canon's Six Sextets:

sense bases (āyatana)

→

feeling ︵vedanā︶

→

craving ︵taṇhā︶

"internal"
sense
organs
<–>
"external"
sense
objects

↓
↓
↓
contact (phassa)
↓
↑

consciousness (viññāṇa)

1. The six internal sense bases are the eye, ear,
  nose, tongue, body & mind.
2. The six external sense bases are visible forms,
  sound, odor, flavors, touch & mental objects.
3. Sense-specific consciousness arises dependent
  on an internal & an external sense base.
4. Contact is the meeting of an internal sense
  base, external sense base & consciousness.
5. Feeling is dependent on contact.
6. Craving is dependent on feeling.
Source: MN 148 (Thanissaro, 1998) diagram details

Overall, rūpa is the Buddhist concept of material form, including both the body and external matter.

More specifically, in the Pali Canon, rūpa is contextualized in three significant frameworks:

- rūpa-khandha – "material forms," one of the five aggregates (khandha) by which all phenomena can be categorized (see Fig. 1).
- rūpa-āyatana – "visible objects," the external sense objects of the eye, one of the six external sense bases (āyatana) by which the world is known (see Fig. 2).
- nāma-rūpa – "name and form" or "mind and body," which in the causal chain of dependent origination (paticca-samuppāda) arises from consciousness and leads to the arising of the sense bases.

In addition, more generally, rūpa is used to describe a statue, in which it is sometimes called Buddharupa.

=== Rūpa-khandha ===
As matter, rūpa is traditionally analysed in two ways: as four primary elements (Pali, mahābhūta); and, as ten or twenty-four secondary or derived elements.

==== Four primary elements ====
Existing rūpa consists in the four primary or underived (no-upādā) elements:

- earth or solidity
- fire or heat
- water or cohesion
- air or movement

==== Derived matter ====
In the Abhidhamma Pitaka and later Pali literature, rūpa is further analyzed in terms of ten or twenty-three or twenty-four types of secondary or derived (upādā) matter. In the list of ten types of secondary matter, the following are identified:

- eye
- ear
- nose
- tongue
- body
- form
- sound
- odour
- taste
- touch

If twenty-four secondary types are enumerated, then the following fifteen are added to the first nine of the above ten:

- femininity
- masculinity or virility
- life or vitality
- heart or heart-basis
- physical indications (movements that indicate intentions)
- vocal indications
- space element
- physical lightness or buoyancy
- physical yieldingness or plasticity
- physical handiness or wieldiness
- physical grouping or integration
- physical extension or maintenance
- physical aging or decay
- physical impermanence
- food

A list of 23 derived types can be found, for instance, in the Abhidhamma Pitaka's Dhammasaṅgaṇī (e.g., Dhs. 596), which omits the list of 24 derived types' "heart-basis."

Relationship between nāmarūpa, pañcakkhandha, and Abhidhamma
Groups			Pañcakkhandha (five aggregates)	Theravada Abhidhamma	
Groups			Pañcakkhandha (five aggregates)	Paramattha-sacca (ultimate reality)	
dhamma	saṅkhāra	nāma (mental)	viññāṇakkhandha (khandha of consciousness)	89/121 citta (consciousness)	81 mundane 8/40 supramundane
dhamma	saṅkhāra	nāma (mental)	vedanākkhandha (khandha of feeling)	52 cetasika (mental factors)	1 vedanācetasika (cetasika of feeling)
dhamma	saṅkhāra	nāma (mental)	saññākkhandha (khandha of perception)	52 cetasika (mental factors)	1 saññācetasika (cetasika of perception)
dhamma	saṅkhāra	nāma (mental)	saṅkhārakkhandha (khandha of formations)	52 cetasika (mental factors)	50 others
dhamma	saṅkhāra	rūpa (form)	rūpakkhandha (khandha of form)	28 rūpa (form)	4 primary elements 24 derived elements
dhamma	-			Nibbāna (Nirvana)	
Notes: The dhamma group consists of saṅkhāra and Nibbāna.; All saṅkhāra are anicca and dukkha.; All dhamma are anattā.; Distinguish between saṅkhāra and saṅkhārakkhandha.

==== Yogacara views ====
According to the Yogacara school, rūpa is not matter as in the metaphysical substance of materialism. Instead it means both materiality and sensibility—signifying, for example, a tactile object both insofar as that object is made of matter and that the object can be tactically sensed. In fact rūpa is more essentially defined by its amenability to being sensed than its being matter: just like everything else it is defined in terms of its function; what it does, not what it is.

=== Rūpa-āyatana ===
Rūpa-āyatana refers to "visual form, visual object, visible object," which is one of the six external sense bases (āyatana) as the object-element (external sense-object) of the sense-element (internal sense-organ) of the eye.

The eighteen elements (aṭṭhārasa dhātuyo) from the internal-external sense bases (āyatana) that condition contact (phassa)
No.	Sense elements (indriya-dhātu)	No.	Object elements (ārammaṇa-dhātu)	No.	Consciousness elements (viññāṇa-dhātu)
1.	eye (cakkhudhātu)	7.	visual form (rūpadhātu)	13.	eye consciousness (cakkhuviññāṇadhātu)
2.	ear (sotadhātu)	8.	sound (saddadhātu)	14.	ear consciousness (sotaviññāṇadhātu)
3.	nose (ghānadhātu)	9	odor/smell (gandhadhātu)	15.	nose consciousness (ghānaviññāṇadhātu)
4.	tongue (jivhādhātu)	10.	taste (rasadhātu)	16.	tongue consciousness (jivhāviññāṇadhātu)
5.	body (kāyadhātu)	11.	touch (phoṭṭhabbadhātu)	17.	body consciousness (kāyaviññāṇadhātu)
6.	mind (manodhātu)	12.	mental object (dhammadhātu)	18.	mind consciousness (manoviññāṇadhātu)

=== The rūpa jhānas ===
Table: Factors of rūpa jhāna
Cetasika (mental factors)	First jhāna	Second jhāna	Third jhāna	Fourth jhāna
Kāma / Akusala dhamma (sensuality / unskillful qualities)	secluded from; withdrawn	does not occur	does not occur	does not occur
Pīti (rapture)	seclusion-born; pervades body	samādhi-born; pervades body	fades away (along with distress)	does not occur
Sukha (non-sensual pleasure)	seclusion-born; pervades body	samādhi-born; pervades body	pervades physical body	abandoned (no pleasure nor pain)
Vitakka ("applied thought")	accompanies jhāna	unification of awareness free from vitakka and vicāra	does not occur	does not occur
Vicāra ("sustained thought")	accompanies jhāna	unification of awareness free from vitakka and vicāra	does not occur	does not occur
Upekkhāsatipārisuddhi (pure, mindful equanimity)	does not occur	internal confidence	equanimous; mindful	purity of equanimity and mindfulness

In the sutras, jhāna is entered when one 'sits down cross-legged and establishes mindfulness'. According to Buddhist tradition, it may be supported by ānāpānasati, mindfulness of breathing, a core meditative practice which can be found in almost all schools of Buddhism. The Suttapiṭaka and the Agamas describe four stages of rūpa jhāna. Rūpa refers to the material realm, in a neutral stance, as different from the kāma-realm (lust, desire) and the arūpa-realm (non-material realm). While interpreted in the Theravada-tradition as describing a deepening concentration and one-pointedness, originally the jhānas seem to describe a development from investigating body and mind and abandoning unwholesome states, to perfected equanimity and watchfulness, an understanding which is retained in Zen and Dzogchen. The stock description of the jhānas, with traditional and alternative interpretations, is as follows: (Note: Keren Arbel refers to Majjhima Nikaya 26, Ariyapariyesana Sutta, The Noble Search See also: * Majjhima Nikaya 111, Anuppada Sutta * AN 05.028, Samadhanga Sutta: The Factors of Concentration. See Johansson (1981), Pali Buddhist texts Explained to Beginners for a word-by-word translation.)

1. First jhāna:
  Separated (vivicceva) from desire for sensual pleasures, separated (vivicca) from [other] unwholesome states (akusalehi dhammehi, unwholesome dhammas), a bhikkhu enters upon and abides in the first jhana, which is [mental] pīti ("rapture," "joy") and [bodily] sukha ("pleasure"; also: 'lasting', in contrast to 'transient' (dukkha)) "born of viveka" (traditionally, "seclusion"; alternatively, "discrimination" (of dhamma's) (Note: Arbel explains that "viveka" is usually translated as "detachment," "separation," or "seclusion," but the primary meaning is "discrimination." According to Arbel, the usage of vivicca/vivicceva and viveka in the description of the first dhyana "plays with both meanings of the verb; namely, its meaning as discernment and the consequent 'seclusion' and letting go," in line with the "discernment of the nature of experience" developed by the four satipatthanas. Compare Dogen: "Being apart from all disturbances and dwelling alone in a quiet place is called "enjoying serenity and tranquility."" Arbel further argues that viveka resembles dhamma vicaya, which is mentioned in the bojjhanga, an alternative description of the dhyanas, but the only bojjhanga-term not mentioned in the stock dhyana-description. Compare Sutta Nipatha 5.14 Udayamāṇavapucchā (The Questions of Udaya): "Pure equanimity and mindfulness, preceded by investigation of principles—this, I declare, is liberation by enlightenment, the smashing of ignorance.” (Translation: Sujato))), accompanied by vitarka-vicara (traditionally, initial and sustained attention to a meditative object; alternatively, initial inquiry and subsequent investigation of dhammas (defilements and wholesome thoughts (Note: Stta Nipatha 5:13 Udaya’s Questions (transl. Thanissaro): "With delight the world’s fettered. With directed thought it’s examined." Chen 2017: "Samadhi with general examination and specific in-depth investigation means getting rid of the not virtuous dharmas, such as greedy desire and hatred, to stay in joy and pleasure caused by nonarising, and to enter the first meditation and fully dwell in it." Arbel 2016, p. 73: "Thus, my suggestion is that we should interpret the existence of vitakka and vicara in the first jhana as wholesome 'residues' of a previous development of wholesome thoughts. They denote the 'echo' of these wholesome thoughts, which reverberates in one who enters the first jhana as wholesome attitudes toward what is experienced.")); also: "discursive thought" (Note: In the Pali canon, Vitakka-vicāra form one expression, which refers to directing one's thought or attention on an object (vitarka) and investigate it (vicāra). According to Dan Lusthaus, vitarka-vicāra is analytic scrutiny, a form of prajna. It "involves focusing on [something] and then breaking it down into its functional components" to understand it, "distinguishing the multitude of conditioning factors implicated in a phenomenal event." The Theravada commentarial tradition, as represented by Buddhaghosa's Visuddhimagga, interprets vitarka and vicāra as the initial and sustained application of attention to a meditational object, which culminates in the stilling of the mind when moving on to the second dhyana. According to Martin Stuart-Fox and Rod Bucknell it may also refer to "the normal process of discursive thought," which is quieted through absorption in the second jhāna.)).
2. Second jhāna:
  Again, with the stilling of vitarka-vicara, a bhikkhu enters upon and abides in the second jhana, which is [mental] pīti and [bodily] sukha "born of samadhi" (samadhi-ji; trad. born of "concentration"; altern. "knowing but non-discursive [...] awareness," "bringing the buried latencies or samskaras into full view" (Note: The standard translation for samadhi is "concentration"; yet, this translation/interpretation is based on commentarial interpretations, as explained by a number of contemporary authors. Tilmann Vetter notes that samadhi has a broad range of meanings, and "concentration" is just one of them. Vetter argues that the second, third and fourth dhyana are samma-samadhi, "right samadhi," building on a "spontaneous awareness" (sati) and equanimity which is perfected in the fourth dhyana.)), and has sampasadana ("stillness," "inner tranquility" (Note: The common translation, based on the commentarial interpretation of dhyana as expanding states of absorption, translates sampasadana as "internal assurance." Yet, as Bucknell explains, it also means "tranquilizing," which is more apt in this context. See also Passaddhi.)) and ekaggata (unification of mind, awareness) without vitarka-vicara;
3. Third jhāna:
  With the fading away of pīti, a bhikkhu abides in upekkhā (equanimity," "affective detachment" (Note: Upekkhā is one of the Brahmaviharas.)), sato (mindful) and [with] sampajañña ("fully knowing," "discerning awareness"). [Still] experiencing sukha with the body, he enters upon and abides in the third jhana, on account of which the noble ones announce, "abiding in [bodily] pleasure, one is equanimous and mindful".
4. Fourth jhāna:
  With the abandoning of [the desire for] sukha ("pleasure") and [aversion to] dukkha ("pain") and with the previous disappearance of [the inner movement between] somanassa ("gladness,") and domanassa ("discontent"), a bhikkhu enters upon and abides in the fourth jhana, which is adukkham asukham ("neither-painful-nor-pleasurable," "freedom from pleasure and pain") and has upekkhā-sati-parisuddhi (complete purity of equanimity and mindfulness). (Note: With the fourth jhāna comes the attainment of higher knowledge (abhijñā), that is, the extinction of all mental intoxicants (āsava), but also psychic powers. For instance in AN 5.28, the Buddha states (Thanissaro, 1997.): "When a monk has developed and pursued the five-factored noble right concentration in this way, then whichever of the six higher knowledges he turns his mind to know and realize, he can witness them for himself whenever there is an opening...." "If he wants, he wields manifold supranormal powers. Having been one he becomes many; having been many he becomes one. He appears. He vanishes. He goes unimpeded through walls, ramparts, and mountains as if through space. He dives in and out of the earth as if it were water. He walks on water without sinking as if it were dry land. Sitting crosslegged he flies through the air like a winged bird. With his hand he touches and strokes even the sun and moon, so mighty and powerful. He exercises influence with his body even as far as the Brahma worlds. He can witness this for himself whenever there is an opening ...")

== See also ==
- Abhidharma
- Body
  - Consciousness
  - Perceptions
  - Sensations
- Buddharupa
- Buddhism and the body
  - Consciousness (Buddhism)
- Namarupa (concept)
- Skandhas
  - Sankhata
  - Sanna
  - Vedana
  - Vijnana
- Substantial form
- Three marks of existence

== Sources ==
- Arbel, Keren (2016), Early Buddhist Meditation: The Four Jhanas as the Actualization of Insight, Routledge, doi:10.4324/9781315676043, ISBN 9781317383994
- Berzin, Alexander (2006), Primary Minds and the 51 Mental Factors
- Bucknell, Robert S. (1993), "Reinterpreting the Jhanas", Journal of the International Association of Buddhist Studies, 16 (2)
- Buddhaghosa, Bhadantācariya (trans. from Pāli by Bhikkhu Ñāṇamoli) (1999). The Path of Purification: Visuddhimagga. Seattle, WA: BPS Pariyatti Editions. ISBN 1-928706-00-2.
- Chen, Naichen (2017), The Great Prajna Paramita Sutra, Volume 1, Wheatmark
- Fuller-Sasaki, Ruth (2008), The Record of Lin-Ji, University of Hawaii Press
- Guenther, Herbert V.; Kawamura, Leslie S. (1975), Mind in Buddhist Psychology: A Translation of Ye-shes rgyal-mtshan's "The Necklace of Clear Understanding" (Kindle ed.), Dharma Publishing
- Hamilton, Sue (2001). Identity and Experience: The Constitution of the Human Being according to Early Buddhism. Oxford: Luzac Oriental. ISBN 1-898942-23-4
- Johansson, Rune Edvin Anders (1981), Pali Buddhist Texts: Explained to the Beginner, Psychology Press
- Kunsang, Erik Pema (2004), Gateway to Knowledge, Vol. 1, North Atlantic Books
- Lusthaus, Dan (2002), Buddhist Phenomenology: A Philosophical Investigation of Yogacara Buddhism and the Ch'eng Wei-shih Lun, Routledge
- Maezumi, Taizan; Cook, Francis Dojun (2007), "The Eight Awarenesses of the Enlightened Person": Dogen Zenji's Hachidainingaku", in Maezumi, Taizan; Glassman, Bernie (eds.), The Hazy Moon of Enlightenment, Wisdom Publications
- Monier-Williams, Monier (1899, 1964). A Sanskrit-English Dictionary. London: Oxford University Press. ISBN 0-19-864308-X. Retrieved 2008-03-06 from "Cologne University" at http://www.sanskrit-lexicon.uni-koeln.de/scans/MWScan/index.php?sfx=pdf
- Polak, Grzegorz (2011), Reexamining Jhana: Towards a Critical Reconstruction of Early Buddhist Soteriology, UMCS
- Rhys Davids, Caroline A.F. ([1900], 2003). Buddhist Manual of Psychological Ethics, of the Fourth Century B.C., Being a Translation, now made for the First Time, from the Original Pāli, of the First Book of the Abhidhamma-Piṭaka, entitled Dhamma-Saṅgaṇi (Compendium of States or Phenomena). Whitefish, MT: Kessinger Publishing. ISBN 0-7661-4702-9
- Rhys-Davids, T.W.; Stede, William, eds. (1921–25), The Pali Text Society's Pali–English dictionary, Pali Text Society)
- Sangpo, Gelong Lodro; Dhammajoti, Bhikkhu K.L. (2012), Abhidharmakosa-Bhasya of Vasubandhu: Volume 3, Motilal Banarsidass
- Sarbacker, Stuart Ray (2021), Tracing the Path of Yoga: The History and Philosophy of Indian Mind-Body Discipline, State University of New York Press
- Shankman, Richard (2008), The Experience of Samadhi: An In-depth Exploration of Buddhist Meditation, Shambhala
- Stuart-Fox, Martin (1989), "Jhana and Buddhist Scholasticism", Journal of the International Association of Buddhist Studies, 12 (2)
- Vetter, Tilmann (1988), The Ideas and Meditative Practices of Early Buddhism, BRILL
- Wayman, Alex (1997), "Introduction", Calming the Mind and Discerning the Real: Buddhist Meditation and the Middle View, from the Lam Rim Chen Mo Tson-kha-pa, Motilal Banarsidass Publishers
- Wynne, Alexander (2007), The Origin of Buddhist Meditation, Routledge
