= Bhava =

Sanskrit word meaning existence and being

Translations of भव
- English: being, worldly existence, becoming, birth, be, production, origin; habitual or emotional tendencies.
- Sanskrit: भव (IAST: bhava)
- Pali: भव (bhava)
- Vietnamese: hữu

Translations of भाव
- English: feeling, emotion, mood, becoming
- Sanskrit: भाव (IAST: bhāva)
- Pali: भाव (bhāva)
- Burmese: ဘာဝ (MLCTS: bàwa̰)
- Khmer: ភព (phob) or ភាវៈ (phiaveak)
- Mon: ဘာဝ ([həwɛ̀ʔ])
- Sinhala: භව or භවය
- Thai: ภวะ (RTGS: phawa) or ภาวะ (RTGS: phawa)

The Sanskrit word bhava (भव) means being, worldly existence, becoming, birth, be, production, origin, but also habitual or emotional tendencies.

In Buddhism, bhava is the tenth of the twelve links of Pratītyasamutpāda. It is the link between reincarnations. In the Thai Forest Tradition, bhava is also interpreted as the habitual or emotional tendencies which leads to the arising of the sense of self, as a mental phenomenon.

== In Buddhism ==
In Buddhism, bhava (not bhāva, condition, nature) means being, worldly existence, becoming, birth, be, production, origin experience, in the sense of rebirths and redeaths, because a being is so conditioned and propelled by the karmic accumulations.

The term bhāva (भाव) is rooted in the term bhava (भव), and also has a double meaning, as emotion, sentiment, state of body or mind, disposition and character, and in some context also means becoming, being, existing, occurring, appearance while connoting the condition thereof.

The 12 Nidānas:
Ignorance
↓
Formations
↓
Consciousness
↓
Name & Form
↓
Six Sense Bases
↓
Contact
↓
Feeling
↓
Craving
↓
Clinging
↓
Becoming
↓
Birth
↓
Old Age & Death

Bhava is the tenth of the twelve links of pratītyasamutpāda (dependent origination), which describes samsara, the repeated cycle of our habitual responses to sensory impressions which leads to renewed jāti, birth. Birth is usually interpreted as rebirth in one of the realms of existence, namely heaven, demi-god, human, animal, hungry ghost or hell realms (bhavacakra) of Buddhist cosmology. In the Thai Forest Tradition, bhava is also interpreted as the habitual or emotional tendencies which leads to the arising of the sense of self, as a mental phenomenon.

In the Jātakas, in which the Buddha didactically reminds various followers of experiences they shared with him in a past life, the hearers are said not to remember them due to bhava, i.e. to having been reborn.

== In Hinduism ==
Bhava appears in the sense of becoming, being, existing, occurring, appearance in the Vedanga literature Shrauta Sutras, the Upanishads such as the Shvetashvatara Upanishad, the Mahabharata and other ancient Hindu texts.

In the Bhagavad Gita (8.6), bhāva is used in the sense of one's state of being or mental orientation at the moment of death, which is said to determine the nature of the soul's next rebirth: "Whatever state of being (bhāva) one remembers when quitting the body, that state he will attain without fail."

== See also ==
- Bhava samadhi – State of ecstatic consciousness
- Rebirth (Buddhism)
- Svabhava – Hindu and Buddhist concept and term
- Twelve Nidanas

Preceded by Upādāna	Twelve Nidānas; Bhava	Succeeded by Jāti
