= Vedanā =

Buddhist term referring to feelings and sensations

Translations of vedanā
- English: feeling, sensation, feeling-tone
- Sanskrit: वेदना (vedanā)
- Pali: वेदना (vedanā)
- Burmese: ဝေဒနာ (MLCTS: wèdənà)
- Chinese: 受 (shòu)
- Indonesian: perasaan
- Japanese: 受 (ju)
- Khmer: វេទនា (UNGEGN: vétônéa)
- Korean: 수 (su)
- Mon: ဝေဒနာ ([wètənɛ̀a])
- Shan: ဝူၺ်ႇတၼႃႇ ([woj2 ta1 naa2])
- Tagalog: ᜊ᜔ᜇᜀᜈᜀ (bedana)
- Tibetan: ཚོར་བ། (Wylie: tshor ba; THL: tsorwa)
- Thai: เวทนา (RTGS: wetthana)
- Vietnamese: 受 (thụ, thọ)

The 12 Nidānas:
Ignorance
↓
Formations
↓
Consciousness
↓
Name & Form
↓
Six Sense Bases
↓
Contact
↓
Feeling
↓
Craving
↓
Clinging
↓
Becoming
↓
Birth
↓
Old Age & Death

Vedanā (Pāli and Sanskrit: वेदना) is an ancient term traditionally translated as either "feeling" or "sensation." In general, vedanā refers to the pleasant, unpleasant and neutral sensations that occur when our internal sense organs come into contact with external sense objects and the associated consciousness. Vedanā is identified as valence or "hedonic tone" in psychology.

Vedanā is identified within the Buddhist teaching as follows:

- One of the seven universal mental factors in the Theravāda Abhidharma.
- One of the five universal mental factors in the Mahāyāna Abhidharma.
- One of the twelve links of dependent origination (in both Theravāda and Mahāyāna traditions).
- One of the five skandas (in both Theravāda and Mahāyāna traditions).
- One of the objects of focus within the four foundations of mindfulness practice.

In the context of the twelve links, craving for and attachment to vedanā leads to suffering; reciprocally, concentrated awareness and clear comprehension of vedanā can lead to Enlightenment and the extinction of the causes of suffering.

== Definitions ==
=== Theravada ===
Bhikkhu Bodhi states:

Feeling is the mental factor which feels the object. It is the affective mode in which the object is experienced. The Pali word vedanā does not signify emotion (which appears to be a complex phenomenon involving a variety of concomitant mental factors), but the bare affective quality of an experience, which may be either pleasant, painful or neutral....

Nina van Gorkom states:

When we study the Abhidhamma we learn that 'vedanā' is not the same as what we mean by feeling in conventional language. Feeling is nāma, it experiences something. Feeling never arises alone; it accompanies citta and other cetasikas and it is conditioned by them. Thus, feeling is a conditioned nāma. Citta does not feel, it cognizes the object and vedanā feels...

All feelings have the function of experiencing the taste, the flavour of an object (Atthasālinī, I, Part IV, Chapter I, 109). The Atthasālinī uses a simile in order to illustrate that feeling experiences the taste of an object and that citta and the other cetasikas which arise together with feeling experience the taste only partially. A cook who has prepared a meal for the king merely tests the food and then offers it to the king who enjoys the taste of it:

...and the king, being lord, expert, and master, eats whatever he likes, even so the mere testing of the food by the cook is like the partial enjoyment of the object by the remaining dhammas (the citta and the other cetasikas), and as the cook tests a portion of the food, so the remaining dhammas enjoy a portion of the object, and as the king, being lord, expert and master, eats the meal according to his pleasure, so feeling, being lord, expert and master, enjoys the taste of the object, and therefore it is said that enjoyment or experience is its function.

Thus, all feelings have in common that they experience the 'taste' of an object. Citta and the other accompanying cetasikas also experience the object, but feeling experiences it in its own characteristic way.

=== Mahayana ===
The Abhidharma-samuccaya states:

What is the absolutely specific characteristic of vedana? It is to experience. That is to say, in any experience, what we experience is the individual maturation of any positive or negative action as its final result.

Mipham Rinpoche states:

Sensations are defined as impressions.
The aggregate of sensations can be divided into three: pleasant, painful, and neutral. Alternatively, there are five: pleasure and mental pleasure, pain and mental pain, and neutral sensation.
In terms of support, there are six sensations resulting from contact...

Alexander Berzin describes this mental factors as feeling (tshor-ba, Skt. vedanā) some level of happiness. He states:

When we hear the word “feeling” in a Buddhist context, it’s only referring to this: feeling some level of happy or unhappy, somewhere on the spectrum. So, on the basis of pleasant contacting awareness—it comes easily to mind—we feel happy. Happiness is: we would like it to continue. And, on the basis of unpleasant contacting awareness—it doesn’t come easily to the mind, we basically want to get rid of it—we feel unhappiness. “Unhappiness” is the same word as “suffering” (mi-bde-ba, Skt. duhkha). Unhappiness is: I don’t want to continue this; I want to be parted from this.

And neutral contacting awareness. We feel neutral about it—neither want to continue it nor to discontinue it...

=== Relation to "emotions" ===
Vedanā is the distinct valence or "hedonic tone" of emotional psychology, neurologically identified and isolated.

Contemporary teachers Bhikkhu Bodhi and Chögyam Trungpa Rinpoche clarify the relationship between vedanā (often translated as "feelings") and Western notions of "emotions."

Bhikkhu Bodhi writes:

"The Pali word vedanā does not signify emotion (which appears to be a complex phenomenon involving a variety of concomitant mental factors), but the bare affective quality of an experience, which may be either pleasant, painful or neutral."

Chögyam Trungpa Rinpoche writes:

"In case [i.e. within the Buddhist teachings] 'feeling' is not quite our ordinary notion of feeling. It is not the feeling we take so seriously as, for instance, when we say, 'He hurt my feelings.' This kind of feeling that we take so seriously belongs to the fourth and fifth skandhas of concept and consciousness."

== Attributes ==
In general, the Pali canon describes vedanā in terms of three "modes" and six "classes." Some discourses discuss alternate enumerations including up to 108 kinds.

=== Three modes, six classes ===
Figure 1: The Pali Canon's Six Sextets:

sense bases (āyatana)

→

feeling ︵vedanā︶

→

craving ︵taṇhā︶

"internal"
sense
organs
<–>
"external"
sense
objects

↓
↓
↓
contact (phassa)
↓
↑

consciousness (viññāṇa)

1. The six internal sense bases are the eye, ear,
  nose, tongue, body & mind.
2. The six external sense bases are visible forms,
  sound, odor, flavors, touch & mental objects.
3. Sense-specific consciousness arises dependent
  on an internal & an external sense base.
4. Contact is the meeting of an internal sense
  base, external sense base & consciousness.
5. Feeling is dependent on contact.
6. Craving is dependent on feeling.
Source: MN 148 (Thanissaro, 1998) diagram details

Throughout canonical discourses (Sutta Pitaka), the Buddha teaches that there are three modes of vedanā:

- pleasant (sukhā)
- unpleasant (dukkhā)
- neither pleasant nor unpleasant (adukkham-asukhā, "ambivalent", sometimes referred to as "neutral" in translation)

Elsewhere in the Pali canon it is stated that there are six classes of vedanā, corresponding to sensations arising from contact (Skt: sparśa; Pali: phassa) between an internal sense organ (āyatana; that is, the eye, ear, nose, tongue, body or mind), an external sense object and the associated consciousness (Skt.: vijnana; Pali: viññāna). (See Figure 1.) In other words:

- feeling arising from the contact of eye, visible form and eye-consciousness
- feeling arising from the contact of ear, sound and ear-consciousness
- feeling arising from the contact of nose, smell and nose-consciousness
- feeling arising from the contact of tongue, taste and tongue-consciousness
- feeling arising from the contact of body, touch and body-consciousness
- feeling arising from the contact of mind (mano), thoughts (dhamma) and mind-consciousness

=== Two, three, five, six, 18, 36, 108 kinds ===
In a few discourses, a multitude of kinds of vedana are alluded to ranging from two to 108, as follows:

- two kinds of feeling: physical and mental
- three kinds: pleasant, painful, neutral
- five kinds: physical pleasant, physical painful, mental pleasant, mental painful, equanimous
- six kinds: one for each sense faculty (eye, ear, nose, tongue, body, mind)
- 18 kinds: explorations of the aforementioned three mental kinds of feelings (mental pleasant, mental painful, equanimous) each in terms of each of the aforementioned six sense faculties
- 36 kinds: the aforementioned 18 kinds of feeling for the householder and the aforementioned 18 kinds for the renunciate
- 108 kinds: the aforementioned 36 kinds for the past, for the present and for the future

In the wider Pali literature, of the above enumerations, the post-canonical Visuddhimagga highlights the five types of vedanā: physical pleasure (sukha); physical displeasure (dukkha); mental happiness (somanassa); mental unhappiness (domanassa); and, equanimity (upekkhā).

== Canonical frameworks ==
Figure 2:
The Five Aggregates (pañcakkhandha)
according to the Pali Canon.

form (rūpa)
4 elements (mahābhūta)
	↓
	contact (phassa)
↓	↑
consciousness (viññāna)

→
←

←

mental factors (cetasika)
feeling (vedanā)
perception (sañña)
formation (saṅkhāra)

- Form is derived from the Four Great Elements.
- Consciousness arises from other aggregates.
- Mental Factors arise from the Contact of
  Consciousness and other aggregates.
- The five aggregates are no-self.

Source: MN 109 (Thanissaro, 2001) | diagram details

Uses of samādhi (based on AN IV.41)
object of concentration	development
four jhānas	pleasant abiding (sukha-vihārāya) in this life (diţţhadhamma)
perception (sañña) of light (āloka)	knowing (ñāṇa) and seeing (dassana)
arising, passing, fading of feelings (vedanā), perceptions (saññā) and thoughts (vitakkā)	mindfulness (sati) and clear comprehension (sampajaññā)
arising and fading of the five aggregates of clinging (pañc'upādāna-khandha)	extinction (khaya) of the taints (āsava) [Arahantship]

Vedanā is a pivotal phenomenon in the following frequently identified frameworks of the Pali canon:

- the "five aggregates"
- the twelve conditions of "dependent origination"
- the four "foundations of mindfulness"

=== Mental aggregate ===
Vedanā is one of the five aggregates (Skt.: skandha; Pali: khandha) of clinging (Skt., Pali: upādāna; see Figure 2 to the right). In the canon, as indicated above, feeling arises from the contact of a sense organ, sense object and consciousness.

=== Central condition ===
In the Chain of Conditioned Arising (Skt: pratītyasamutpāda; Pali: paṭiccasamuppāda), the Buddha explains that:

- vedanā arises with contact (phassa) as its condition
- vedanā acts as a condition for craving (Pali: taṇhā; Skt.: tṛṣṇā).

In the post-canonical 5th-century Visuddhimagga, feeling (vedana) is identified as simultaneously and inseparably arising from consciousness (viññāṇa) and the mind-and-body (nāmarūpa). On the other hand, while this text identifies feeling as decisive to craving and its mental sequelae leading to suffering, the conditional relationship between feeling and craving is not identified as simultaneous nor as being karmically necessary.

=== Mindfulness base ===
Throughout the canon, there are references to the four "foundations of mindfulness" (satipaṭṭhāna): the body (kāya), feelings (vedanā), mind states (citta) and mental experiences (dhammā). These four foundations are recognized among the seven sets of qualities conducive to enlightenment (bodhipakkhiyādhammā). The use of vedanā and the other satipaṭṭhāna in Buddhist meditation practices can be found in the Satipaṭṭhāna Sutta and the Ānāpānasati Sutta.

=== Wisdom practices ===
Each mode of vedanā is accompanied by its corresponding underlying tendency or obsession (anusaya). The underlying tendency for pleasant vedanā is the tendency toward lust, for unpleasant, the tendency toward aversion, and for neither pleasant nor unpleasant, the tendency toward ignorance.

In the Canon it is stated that meditating with concentration (samādhi) on vedanā can lead to deep mindfulness (sati) and clear comprehension (sampajañña) (see Table to the right). With this development, one can experience directly within oneself the reality of impermanence (anicca) and the nature of attachment (upādāna). This in turn can ultimately lead to liberation of the mind (nibbāna).

== Alternate translations ==
Alternate translations for the term vedana are:

- Feeling (Nina van Gorkom, Bhikkhu Bodhi, Alexander Berzin)
- Feeling some level of happiness (Alexander Berzin)
- Feeling-tone (Herbert Guenther)
- Sensation (Erik Kunsang)

== See also ==
- Affect (psychology)
- Ṣaḍāyatana (Skt.; Pali: saḷāyatana) - six sense bases
- Satipaṭṭhāna (Pali; Skt.: smṛtyupasthāna) - foundations of mindfulness
- Skandha (Skt.; Pali: khandha) - aggregates
- Valence (psychology)

== Sources ==
- Berzin, Alexander (2006), Primary Minds and the 51 Mental Factors
- Bodhi, Bhikkhu (ed.) (2000). A Comprehensive Manual of Abhidhamma: The Abhidhammattha Sangaha of Ācariya Anuruddha. Seattle, WA: BPS Pariyatti Editions. ISBN 1-928706-02-9.
- Bhikkhu Bodhi (2003), A Comprehensive Manual of Abhidhamma, Pariyatti Publishing
- Dalai Lama (1992). The Meaning of Life, translated and edited by Jeffrey Hopkins, Boston: Wisdom.
- Guenther, Herbert V. & Leslie S. Kawamura (1975), Mind in Buddhist Psychology: A Translation of Ye-shes rgyal-mtshan's "The Necklace of Clear Understanding" Dharma Publishing. Kindle Edition.
- Kunsang, Erik Pema (translator) (2004). Gateway to Knowledge, Vol. 1. North Atlantic Books.
- Nina van Gorkom (2010), ''Cetasikas'', Zolag
- Thanissaro Bhikkhu (trans.) (1997). Paticca-samuppada-vibhanga Sutta: Analysis of Dependent Co-arising, Access to Insight
- Hamilton, Sue (2001). Identity and Experience: The Constitution of the Human Being according to Early Buddhism. Oxford: Luzac Oriental. ISBN 1-898942-23-4.
- Nyanaponika Thera (trans.) (1983). Datthabba Sutta: To Be Known (SN 36.5). Retrieved 2007-06-08 from "Access to Insight" at: http://www.accesstoinsight.org/tipitaka/sn/sn36/sn36.005.nypo.html.
- Nyanaponika Thera & Bhikkhu Bodhi (trans.) (1999). Numerical Discourses of the Buddha: An Anthology of Suttas from the Anguttara Nikaya. Kandy, Sri Lanka: Buddhist Publication Society. ISBN 0-7425-0405-0.
- Rhys Davids, T.W. & William Stede (eds.) (1921-5). The Pali Text Society’s Pali–English Dictionary. Chipstead: Pali Text Society. A general on-line search engine for the PED is available at http://dsal.uchicago.edu/dictionaries/pali/.
- Sri Lanka Buddha Jayanti Tipitaka Series (SLTP) (n.d.). Samādhibhāvanāsuttaṃ (AN AN 4.1.5.1, in Pali). Retrieved 2007-06-08 from "MettaNet-Lanka" at: http://www.metta.lk/tipitaka/2Sutta-Pitaka/4Anguttara-Nikaya/Anguttara2/4-catukkanipata/005-rohitassavaggo-p.html.
- Thanissaro Bhikkhu (trans.) (1997a). Samadhi Sutta: Concentration (AN 4.41). Retrieved on 2007-06-08 from "Access to Insight" at: http://www.accesstoinsight.org/tipitaka/an/an04/an04.041.than.html.
- Thanissaro Bhikkhu (trans.) (1997b). Sattatthana Sutta: Seven Bases (SN 22.57). Retrieved 2007-06-08 from "Access to Insight" at: http://www.accesstoinsight.org/tipitaka/sn/sn22/sn22.057.than.html.
- Thanissaro Bhikkhu (trans.) (1998). Chachakka Sutta: The Six Sextets (MN 148). Retrieved 2007-06-08 from "Access to Insight" at: http://www.accesstoinsight.org/tipitaka/mn/mn.148.than.html.
- Thanissaro Bhikkhu (trans.) (2004). Vedana Sutta: Feeling (SN 25.5). Retrieved 2007-06-08 from "Access to Insight" at: http://www.accesstoinsight.org/tipitaka/sn/sn25/sn25.005.than.html.
- Thanissaro Bhikkhu (trans.) (2005a). Atthasata Sutta: The One-hundred-and-eight Exposition (SN 36.22). Retrieved 2008-03-31 from "Access to Insight" at http://www.accesstoinsight.org/tipitaka/sn/sn36/sn36.022.than.html.
- Thanissaro Bhikkhu (trans.) (2005b). Bahuvedaniya Sutta: Many Things to be Experienced (MN 59). Retrieved 2008-03-31 from "Access to Insight" at http://www.accesstoinsight.org/tipitaka/mn/mn.059.than.html.
- Thanissaro Bhikkhu (trans.) (2005c). Pañcakanga Sutta: With Pañcakanga (SN 36.19). Retrieved 2008-03-31 from "Access to Insight" at http://www.accesstoinsight.org/tipitaka/sn/sn36/sn36.019.than.html.
- Trungpa, Chögyam (2001). Glimpses of Abhidharma. Boston: Shambhala. ISBN 1-57062-764-9.
- Upalavanna, Sister (n.d.). Samādhibhāvanāsuttaṃ – Developments of concentration (AN AN 4.5.1). Retrieved 2007-06-08 from "MettaNet-Lanka" at: http://www.metta.lk/tipitaka/2Sutta-Pitaka/4Anguttara-Nikaya/Anguttara2/4-catukkanipata/005-rohitassavaggo-e.html.

Preceded by Sparśa	Twelve Nidānas; Vedanā	Succeeded by Tṛṣṇā
