= Saṅkhāra =

Buddhist concept of "formations"

Translations of saṅkhāra
- English: formations volitional formations volitional activities
- Sanskrit: संस्कार (saṃskāra)
- Pali: संखार (saṅkhāra)
- Bengali: সংস্কার
- Burmese: သင်္ခါရ (MLCTS: θɪ̀ɰ̃kʰàja̰)
- Chinese: 行 (Pinyin: xíng)
- Japanese: 行 (Rōmaji: gyō)
- Khmer: សង្ខារ (UNGEGN: Sângkhar; ALA-LC: Sangkhār)
- Korean: 행 (RR: haeng)
- Sinhala: සංස්කාර (saṃskāra)
- Tagalog: ᜐᜅ᜔ᜃᜎ (sankhala)
- Tibetan: འདུ་བྱེད་ ('du.byed)
- Thai: สังขาร (RTGS: sangkhan)
- Vietnamese: 行 (hành) tạo tác

Saṅkhāra (Pali; संखार; Sanskrit: संस्कार or saṃskāra) is a term figuring prominently in Buddhism. The word means 'formations' or 'that which has been put together' and 'that which puts together'.

In the first (passive) sense, saṅkhāra refers to conditioned phenomena generally but specifically to all mental "dispositions". These are called 'volitional formations' both because they are formed as a result of volition and because they are causes for the arising of future volitional actions. English translations for saṅkhāra in the first sense of the word include 'conditioned things,' 'determinations,' 'fabrications' and 'formations' (or, particularly when referring to mental processes, 'volitional formations').

In the second (active) sense of the word, saṅkhāra refers to karma (sankhara-khandha) that leads to conditioned arising, dependent origination.

== Etymology ==
Saṅkhāra is a Pali word that is cognate with the Sanskrit word saṃskāra. The latter word is not a Vedic Sanskrit term, but found extensively in classical and epic era Sanskrit in all Indian philosophies. Saṃskāra is found in the Upanishads such as in verse 2.6 of Kaushitaki Upanishad, 4.16.2–4 of Chandogya Upanishad, 6.3.1 of Brihadaranyaka Upanishad as well as mentioned by the ancient Indian scholar Panini and many others. Saṅkhāra appears in the Buddhist Pitaka texts with a variety of meanings and contexts, somewhat different from the Upanishadic texts, particularly for anything to predicate impermanence.

It is a complex concept, with no single-word English translation, that fuses "object and subject" as interdependent parts of each human's consciousness and epistemological process. It connotes "impression, disposition, conditioning, forming, perfecting in one's mind, influencing one's sensory and conceptual faculty" as well as any "preparation, sacrament" that "impresses, disposes, influences or conditions" how one thinks, conceives or feels.

== Contextual meaning ==
Relationship between nāmarūpa, pañcakkhandha, and Abhidhamma
Groups			Pañcakkhandha (five aggregates)	Theravada Abhidhamma	
Groups			Pañcakkhandha (five aggregates)	Paramattha-sacca (ultimate reality)	
dhamma	saṅkhāra	nāma (mental)	viññāṇakkhandha (khandha of consciousness)	89/121 citta (consciousness)	81 mundane 8/40 supramundane
dhamma	saṅkhāra	nāma (mental)	vedanākkhandha (khandha of feeling)	52 cetasika (mental factors)	1 vedanācetasika (cetasika of feeling)
dhamma	saṅkhāra	nāma (mental)	saññākkhandha (khandha of perception)	52 cetasika (mental factors)	1 saññācetasika (cetasika of perception)
dhamma	saṅkhāra	nāma (mental)	saṅkhārakkhandha (khandha of formations)	52 cetasika (mental factors)	50 others
dhamma	saṅkhāra	rūpa (form)	rūpakkhandha (khandha of form)	28 rūpa (form)	4 primary elements 24 derived elements
dhamma	-			Nibbāna (Nirvana)	
Notes: The dhamma group consists of saṅkhāra and Nibbāna.; All saṅkhāra are anicca and dukkha.; All dhamma are anattā.; Distinguish between saṅkhāra and saṅkhārakkhandha.

=== Conditioned things ===
In the first (passive) sense, saṅkhāra refers to "conditioned things" or "dispositions, mental imprint". All aggregates in the world – physical or mental concomitants, and all phenomena, state early Buddhist texts, are conditioned things. It can refer to any compound form in the universe whether a tree, a cloud, a human being, a thought or a molecule. All these are saṅkhāras, as well as everything that is physical and visible in the phenomenal world are conditioned things, or aggregate of mental conditions. The Buddha taught that all saṅkhāras are impermanent and essenceless. These subjective dispositions, states Buddhist scholar David Kalupahana, "prevented the Buddha from attempting to formulate an ultimately objective view of the world".

Since conditioned things and dispositions are perceptions and do not have real essence, they are not reliable sources of pleasure and they are impermanent. Understanding the significance of this reality is wisdom. This "conditioned things" sense of the word Saṅkhāra appears in Four Noble Truths and in Buddhist theory of dependent origination, that is how ignorance or misconceptions about impermanence and non-self leads to Taṇhā and rebirths. The Samyutta Nikaya II.12.1 presents one such explanation, as do other Pali texts.

The last words of the Buddha, according to the Mahāparinibbāna Sutta, were "Disciples, this I declare to you: All conditioned things are subject to disintegration – strive on untiringly for your liberation." (Pali: "handa'dāni bhikkhave āmantayāmi vo, vayadhammā saṅkhārā appamādena sampādethā ti.").

=== Aggregate of saṅkhāra ===
The 12 Nidānas:
Ignorance
↓
Formations
↓
Consciousness
↓
Name & Form
↓
Six Sense Bases
↓
Contact
↓
Feeling
↓
Craving
↓
Clinging
↓
Becoming
↓
Birth
↓
Old Age & Death

The Five Aggregates (pañcakkhandha)
according to the Pali Canon.

form (rūpa)
4 elements (mahābhūta)
	↓
	contact (phassa)
↓	↑
consciousness (viññāna)

→
←

←

mental factors (cetasika)
feeling (vedanā)
perception (sañña)
formation (saṅkhāra)

- Form is derived from the Four Great Elements.
- Consciousness arises from other aggregates.
- Mental Factors arise from the Contact of
  Consciousness and other aggregates.
- The five aggregates are no-self.

Source: MN 109 (Thanissaro, 2001) | diagram details

In the second (active) sense, saṅkhāra (or saṅkhāra-khandha, aggregate of saṅkhāra) refers to the form-creating faculty of mind. It is part of the doctrine of conditioned arising or dependent origination (paṭiccasamuppāda). In this sense, the term Sankhara is karmically active volition or intention, which generates rebirth and influences the realm of rebirth. Sankhara herein is synonymous with karma, and includes actions of the body, speech and mind.

The saṅkhāra-khandha states that living beings are reborn (bhava, become) by means of actions of body and speech (kamma). The Buddha stated that all volitional constructs are conditioned by ignorance (avijja) of impermanence and non-self. It is this ignorance that leads to the origination of the sankharas and ultimately causes human suffering (dukkha). The cessation of all such sankharas (sabba-saṅkhāra-nirodha) is synonymous with Awakening (bodhi), the attainment of nirvana. The end of conditioned arising or dependent origination in the karmic sense (Sankharas), yields the unconditioned phenomenon of nirvana.

As the ignorance conditions the volitional formations, these formations condition, in turn, the consciousness (viññāna). The Buddha elaborated:

'What one intends, what one arranges, and what one obsesses about: This is a support for the stationing of consciousness. There being a support, there is a landing [or: an establishing] of consciousness. When that consciousness lands and grows, there is the production of renewed becoming in the future. When there is the production of renewed becoming in the future, there is future birth, aging & death, sorrow, lamentation, pain, distress, & despair. Such is the origination of this entire mass of suffering & stress.'

=== Mental factors ===
Mental factors (Sanskrit: caitasika; Pali: cetasika; Tibetan Wylie: sems byung) are formations (Sanskrit: saṅkhāra) concurrent with mind (Sanskrit: citta). They can be described as aspects of the mind that apprehend the quality of an object, and that have the ability to color the mind.

== Relation to Nibbāna ==
The Buddha emphasized the need to purify dispositions rather than eliminate them completely.

Kalupahana states that "the elimination of dispositions is epistemological suicide," as dispositions determine our perspectives. The development of one's personality in the direction of perfection or imperfection rests with one's dispositions.

When preliminary nibbana with substrate occurs (that is, nibbana of a living being), constructive consciousness (that is, the house-builder) is completely destroyed and no new formations will be constructed. However, sankharas in the sense of constructed consciousness, which exists as a "karmically-resultant-consciousness" (vipāka viññāna), continue to exist. Each liberated individual produces no new karma, but preserves a particular individual personality which is the result of the traces of his or her karmic heritage. The very fact that there is a psycho-physical substrate during the remainder of an arahant's lifetime shows the continuing effect of karma.

== English translations ==
- Activities (Ajahn Sucitto)
- Concoctions (Santikaro)
- Conditions
- Conditioning Factors
- Conditioned things
- Constructions (similar to the idea of Social Constructionism)
- Determinations
- Fabrications
- Formations (Bhikkhu Bodhi)
- Karmic formations
- Mental constructions
- Mental constructs (Bhante S. Dhammika)
- Preparations (Bhikkhu Katukurunde Ñāṇānanda)
- Volitional activities
- Volitional dispositions
- Volitional formations (Bhikkhu Bodhi)

== See also ==
- Sankhata
- Kleshas (Buddhism)
- Mental factors (Buddhism)
- Paticca-samuppada
- Samskara (Indian philosophy) – Hindu concept
- Skandha

== Sources ==
- Bodhi, Bhikkhu (trans.) (2000). The Connected Discourses of the Buddha: A Translation of the Samyutta Nikaya. Boston: Wisdom Publications. ISBN 0-86171-331-1.
- Geshe Tashi Tsering (2006). Buddhist Psychology: The Foundation of Buddhist Thought. Perseus Books Group. Kindle Edition.
- Guenther, Herbert V. & Leslie S. Kawamura (1975), Mind in Buddhist Psychology: A Translation of Ye-shes rgyal-mtshan's "The Necklace of Clear Understanding" Dharma Publishing. Kindle Edition.
- Kunsang, Erik Pema (translator) (2004). Gateway to Knowledge, Vol. 1. North Atlantic Books.
- Piyadassi Thera (trans.) (1999). Girimananda Sutta: Discourse to Girimananda Thera (AN 10.60). Retrieved 2007-11-18 from "Access to Insight" at Girimananda Sutta: Discourse to Girimananda Thera.
- Radhakrishnan, S. and Moore, C.A. (1957). A Sourcebook in Indian Philosophy. Princeton University Press.
- Thanissaro Bhikkhu (trans.) (1995). Cetana Sutta: Intention (SN 12.38). Retrieved 2007-11-16 from "Access to Insight" at Cetana Sutta: Intention.
- Thanissaro Bhikkhu (trans.) (1997a). Avijja Sutta: Ignorance (SN 45.1). Retrieved 2007-11-16 from "Access to Insight" at Avijja Sutta: Ignorance.
- Thanissaro Bhikkhu (trans.) (1997b). Paticca-samuppada-vibhanga Sutta: Analysis of Dependent Co-arising (SN 12.2). Retrieved 2007-11-16 from "Access to Insight" at Paticca-samuppada-vibhanga Sutta: Analysis of Dependent Co-arising.
- Thanissaro Bhikkhu (trans.) (2001). Khajjaniya Sutta: Chewed Up (SN 22.79). Retrieved 2007-11-18 from "Access to Insight" at Khajjaniya Sutta: Chewed Up.

Preceded by Avidyā	Twelve Nidānas; Saṃskāra	Succeeded by Vijñāna
