= Upādāna =

Buddhist concept of attachment

Translations of Upādāna
- English: clinging, grasping, attachment or fuel, material cause
- Sanskrit: उपादान, (upādāna)
- Pali: upādāna
- Burmese: ဥပါဒါန် (MLCTS: ṵ pà dàɰ̃)
- Chinese: 取 (Pinyin: qǔ)
- Japanese: 取 (Rōmaji: shu)
- Khmer: ឧបដ្ឋាន (Upathan)
- Korean: 取 (취) (RR: chui)
- Sinhala: උපාදාන
- Tagalog: ᜀᜉᜇᜈ (apadana)
- Tibetan: ལེན་པ (Wylie: len.pa)
- Thai: อุปาทาน (RTGS: upathan)
- Vietnamese: 取 (thủ)

Upādāna (Hindi: उपादान) is a Sanskrit and Pali word that means "fuel, material cause, substrate that is the source and means for keeping an active process energized". It is also an important Buddhist concept referring to "attachment, clinging, grasping". In Buddhism, it is considered to be the result of taṇhā (craving), and is part of duḥkha (dissatisfaction, suffering, pain).

== Buddhism ==
Upādāna is the Sanskrit and Pāli word for "clinging", "attachment" or "grasping", although the literal meaning is "fuel". Upādāna and taṇhā (Skt. tṛṣṇā) are seen as the two primary causes of dukkha ("suffering", unease, "standing unstable"). The cessation of clinging is nirvana, the coming to rest of the grasping mind.

=== Types of clinging ===
In the Sutta Pitaka, the Buddha states that there are four types of clinging:

- sense-pleasure clinging (kāmupādāna)
- view clinging (diṭṭhupādāna)
- rites-and-rituals clinging (sīlabbatupādāna)
- self-doctrine clinging (attavādupādāna).

The Buddha once stated that, while other sects might provide an appropriate analysis of the first three types of clinging, he alone fully elucidated clinging to the "self" and its resultant unease.

The Abhidhamma and its commentaries provide the following definitions for these four clinging types:

1. sense-pleasure clinging: repeated craving of worldly things.
2. view clinging: such as eternalism (e.g., "The world and self are eternal") or nihilism.
3. rites-and-rituals clinging: believing that rites alone could directly lead to liberation, typified in the texts by the rites and rituals of "ox practice" and "dog practice."
4. self-doctrine clinging: self-identification with self-less entities (e.g., illustrated by MN 44, and further discussed in the skandha and anatta articles).

According to Buddhaghosa, the above ordering of the four types of clinging is in terms of decreasing grossness, that is, from the most obvious (grossest) type of clinging (sense-pleasure clinging) to the subtlest (self-doctrine clinging).

=== Interdependence of clinging types ===
self-doctrine clinging
↓
wrong-view clinging
↓	↓
rites-and-rituals clinging	sense-pleasure clinging

Buddhaghosa further identifies that these four clinging types are causally interconnected as follows:

1. self-doctrine clinging: first, one assumes that one has a permanent "self."
2. wrong-view clinging: then, one assumes that one is either somehow eternal or to be annihilated after this life.
3. resultant behavioral manifestations:
  1. rites-and-rituals clinging: if one assumes that one is eternal, then one clings to rituals to achieve self-purification.
  2. sense-pleasure clinging: if one assumes that one will completely disappear after this life, then one disregards the next world and clings to sense desires.

This hierarchy of clinging types is represented diagrammatically to the right.

Thus, based on Buddhaghosa's analysis, clinging is more fundamentally an erroneous core belief (self-doctrine clinging) than a habitualized affective experience (sense-pleasure clinging).

=== Manifestations of clinging ===
The 12 Nidānas:
Ignorance
↓
Formations
↓
Consciousness
↓
Name & Form
↓
Six Sense Bases
↓
Contact
↓
Feeling
↓
Craving
↓
Clinging
↓
Becoming
↓
Birth
↓
Old Age & Death

In terms of consciously knowable mental experiences, the Abhidhamma identifies sense-pleasure clinging with the mental factor of "greed" (lobha) and the other three types of clinging (self-doctrine, wrong-view and rites-and-rituals clinging) with the mental factor of "wrong view" (ditthi). Thus, experientially, clinging can be known through the Abhidhamma's fourfold definitions of these mental factors as indicated in the following table:

	characteristic	function	manifestation	proximate cause
greed (lobha)	grasping an object	sticks, like hot-pan meat	not giving up	enjoying things of bondage
wrong view (ditthi)	unwise interpreting	presumes	wrong belief	not hearing the Dhamma

To distinguish craving from clinging, Buddhaghosa uses the following metaphor:

"Craving is the aspiring to an object that one has not yet reached, like a thief's stretching out his hand in the dark; clinging is the grasping of an object that one has reached, like the thief's grasping his objective.... [T]hey are the roots of the suffering due to seeking and guarding."

Thus, for instance, when the Buddha talks about the "aggregates of clinging," he is referring to our grasping and guarding physical, mental and conscious experiences that we falsely believe we are or possess.

=== As part of the causal chain of suffering ===
In the Four Noble Truths, the First Noble Truth identifies clinging (upādāna, in terms of "the aggregates of clinging") as one of the core experiences of suffering. The Second Noble Truth identifies craving (tanha, lit. thirst) as the basis for being at unease. In this manner a causal relationship between craving and clinging is found in the Buddha's most fundamental teaching.

In the twelve-linked chain of Dependent Origination (Pratītyasamutpāda, also see Twelve Nidanas), clinging (upādāna) is the ninth causal link:

- Upādāna (Clinging, fueling) is dependent on Taṇhā (Craving, thirst) as a condition before it can exist.

"With Craving, thirst as condition, Clinging, fueling arises".

- Upādāna (Clinging, fueling) is also the prevailing condition for the next condition in the chain, Becoming, growing (Bhava).

"With Clinging as condition, Becoming arises."

According to Buddhaghosa, it is sense-pleasure clinging that arises from craving and that conditions becoming.

=== Upādāna as fuel ===
Professor Richard F. Gombrich has pointed out in several publications, and in his Numata Visiting Professor Lectures at the University of London, School of Oriental and African Studies (SOAS), that the literal meaning of upādāna is "fuel". He uses this to link the term to the Buddha's use of fire as a metaphor. In the so-called Fire Sermon (Āditta-pariyāya) (Vin I, 34-5; SN 35.28) the Buddha tells the bhikkhus that everything is on fire. By everything he tells them he means the five senses plus the mind, their objects, and the operations and feelings they give rise to — i.e. everything means the totality of experience. All these are burning with the fires of greed, hatred and delusion.

In the nidana chain, then, craving creates fuel for continued burning or becoming (bhava). The mind like fire, seeks out more fuel to sustain it, in the case of the mind this is sense experience, hence the emphasis the Buddha places on "guarding the gates of the senses". By not being caught up in the senses (appamāda) we can be liberated from greed, hatred and delusion. This liberation is also expressed using the fire metaphor when it is termed nibbāna (Sanskrit: Nirvāṇa) which means to "go out", or literally to "blow out the flames of defilement". (Regarding the word Nirvāṇa, the verb vā is intransitive so no agent is required.)

Probably by the time the canon was written down (1st Century BCE), and certainly when Buddhaghosa was writing his commentaries (4th Century CE) the sense of the metaphor appears to have been lost, and upādāna comes to mean simply "clinging" as above. By the time of the Mahayana the term fire was dropped altogether and greed, hatred and delusion are known as the "three poisons".

== Hinduism ==
The term Upādāna appears in the sense of "material cause" in ancient Vedic and medieval Hindu texts. For medieval era Vaishnavism scholar Ramanuja, the metaphysical Hindu concept of Brahman (as Vishnu) is the upadana-karana (material cause) of the universe. However, other Hindu traditions such as the Advaita Vedanta disagree and assert alternate theories on the nature of metaphysical Brahman and the universe while using the term upadana in the sense of "substrate, fuel".

More generally, the realist Hindu philosophies such as Samkhya and Nyaya have asserted that Brahman is the Upādāna of the phenomenal world. The philosophies within the Buddhist schools have denied Brahman, asserted impermanence and that the notion of anything real is untenable from a metaphysical sense. The Hindu traditions such as those influenced by Advaita Vedanta have asserted the position that everything (Atman, Brahman, Prakriti) is ultimately one identical reality. The concept Upādāna also appears with other sense of meanings, in Vedanta philosophies, such as "taking in".

== See also ==
- Anatta
- Cathexis
- Five Skandhas
- Detachment (philosophy)
  - Nekkhamma
- Pratitya-samutpada
- Twelve Nidanas

== Bibliography ==
- Bodhi, Bhikku (2000a). A Comprehensive Manual of Abhidhamma: The Abhidhammattha Sangaha of Acariya Anuruddha. Seattle, WA: BPS Pariyatti Editions. ISBN 1-928706-02-9.
- Bodhi, Bhikkhu (trans.) (2000b). The Connected Discourses of the Buddha: A Translation of the Samyutta Nikaya. Boston: Wisdom Publications. ISBN 0-86171-331-1.
- Bodhi, Bhikkhu (ed.) (2005). In the Buddha's Words: An Anthology of Discourses from the Pāli Canon.Boston: Wisdom Pubs. ISBN 0-86171-491-1.
- Buddhaghosa, Bhadantācariya (trans. from Pāli by Bhikkhu Ñāṇamoli) (1999). The Path of Purification: Visuddhimagga. Seattle, WA: BPS Pariyatti Editions. ISBN 1-928706-00-2.
- Gombrich, Richard F. (2005). How Buddhism Began: The Conditioned Genesis of the Early Teachings. Routledge. ISBN 0-415-37123-6.
- Ñāṇamoli, Bhikkhu (trans.) Anatta-lakkhana Sutta: The Discourse on the Not-self Characteristic (SN 22.59). Retrieved from "Access to Insight" at Anatta-lakkhana Sutta: The Discourse on the Not-self Characteristic.
- Ñāṇamoli, Bhikkhu (trans.) & Bhikkhu Khantipalo (ed.) (1993). Kukkuravatika Sutta: The Dog-duty Ascetic (MN 57). Retrieved from "Access to Insight" at Kukkuravatika Sutta: The Dog-duty Ascetic.
- Ñāṇamoli, Bhikkhu (trans.) & Bhikkhu Bodhi (trans.) (1993). Cula-sihanada Sutta: The Shorter Discourse on the Lion's Roar (MN 11). Retrieved 2007-11-19 from "Access to Insight" (1994) at Cula-sihanada Sutta: The Shorter Discourse on the Lion's Roar.
- Ñāṇamoli, Bhikkhu (trans.) & Bhikkhu Bodhi (ed.) (2001). The Middle-Length Discourses of the Buddha: A Translation of the Majjhima Nikāya. Boston: Wisdom Publications. ISBN 0-86171-072-X.
- Olendzki, Andrew (trans.) (2005). The Healing Medicine of the Dhamma (excerpt) (Miln 5 [verse 335]). Retrieved from "Access to Insight" at The Healing Medicine of the Dhamma.
- Rhys Davids, Caroline A.F. ([1900], 2003). Buddhist Manual of Psychological Ethics, of the Fourth Century B.C., Being a Translation, now made for the First Time, from the Original Pāli, of the First Book of the Abhidhamma-Piṭaka, entitled Dhamma-Saṅgaṇi (Compendium of States or Phenomena). Whitefish, MT: Kessinger Publishing. ISBN 0-7661-4702-9.
- Rhys Davids, T.W. & William Stede (eds.) (1921-5). The Pali Text Society’s Pali–English Dictionary. Chipstead: Pali Text Society. A general on-line search engine for the PED is available from "U. of Chicago" at http://dsal.uchicago.edu/dictionaries/pali/.
- Thanissaro Bhikkhu (trans.) (1997a). Paticca-samuppada-vibhanga Sutta: Analysis of Dependent Co-arising (SN 12.2). Retrieved from "Access to Insight" at Paticca-samuppada-vibhanga Sutta: Analysis of Dependent Co-arising.
- Thanissaro Bhikkhu (trans.) (1997). Samaññaphala Sutta: The Fruits of the Contemplative Life (DN 2). Retrieved from "Access to Insight" at Samaññaphala Sutta: The Fruits of the Contemplative Life.
- Thanissaro Bhikkhu (trans.) (1998a). Culavedalla Sutta: The Shorter Set of Questions-and-Answers (MN 44). Retrieved from "Access to Insight" at Culavedalla Sutta: The Shorter Set of Questions-and-Answers.
- Thanissaro Bhikkhu (trans.) (1998b). Upadana Sutta: Clinging (SN 12.52). Retrieved from "Access to Insight" at Upadana Sutta: Clinging.
- Thanissaro Bhikkhu (trans.) (1999). Ratha-vinita Sutta: Relay Chariots (MN 24). Retrieved from "Access to Insight" at Ratha-vinita Sutta: Relay Chariots.
- Thanissaro Bhikkhu (2000). Life isn't just Suffering. Retrieved from "Access to Insight" at Life Isn't Just Suffering.
- Walshe, Maurice O'Connell (trans.) (1995). The Long Discourses of the Buddha: A Translation of the Dīgha Nikāya. Somerville: Wisdom Publications. ISBN 0-86171-103-3.

Preceded by Taṇhā	Twelve Nidānas; Upādāna	Succeeded by Bhava
