= Jarāmaraṇa =

Translations of jarāmaraṇa
- English: old age and death
- Sanskrit: जरामरण
- Pali: jarāmaraṇa
- Burmese: ဇရာမရဏံ (MLCTS: ja.ra ma.ra.nam)
- Chinese: 老死 (Pinyin: lǎosǐ)
- Indonesian: penuaan dan kematian
- Japanese: 老死 (Rōmaji: rōshi)
- Khmer: ជរាមរណៈ (UNGEGN: chôréamôrônă)
- Korean: 노사 (South), 로사 (North) (RR: nosa, rosa)
- Sinhala: ජරාමරණ (jarāmaraṇa)
- Tagalog: kalamalana
- Tibetan: རྒ་ཤི་ (THL: ga.shi Wylie: rga.shi)
- Thai: ชรามรณะ (RTGS: chrā mrṇa)
- Vietnamese: tuổi già và cái chết

Jarāmaraṇa is Sanskrit and Pāli for "old age" (jarā) and "death" (maraṇa). In Buddhism, jaramarana is associated with the inevitable decay and death-related suffering of all beings prior to their rebirth within saṃsāra (cyclic existence).

Jarā and maraṇa are identified as the twelfth link within the Twelve Links of Dependent Origination.

== Etymology ==
The word jarā is related to the older Vedic Sanskrit word jarā, jaras, jarati, gerā, which means "to become brittle, to decay, to be consumed". The Vedic root is related to the Latin granum, Goth. kaurn, Greek geras, geros (later geriatric) all of which in one context mean "hardening, old age".

The word maraṇa is based on the Vedic Sanskrit root mṛ, mriyate which means death. The Vedic root is related to later Sanskrit marta, as well as to German mord, Lith. mirti, Latin morior and mors, and Greek μόρος, all of which mean "to die, death".

== Within the Four Noble Truths ==
Within the teachings on the Four Noble Truths, jarā and maraṇa are identified as aspects of dukkha (suffering, anxiety, unsatisfactoriness). For example, The Discourse That Sets Turning the Wheel of Truth states:

"Now this, bhikkhus, for the spiritually ennobled ones, is the true reality which is pain: birth is painful, aging is painful, illness is painful, death is painful; sorrow, lamentation, physical pain, unhappiness and distress are painful; union with what is disliked is painful; separation from what is liked is painful; not to get what one wants is painful; in brief, the five bundles of grasping-fuel are painful." – Dhammacakkappavattana Sutta, Samyutta Nikaya, Translated by Peter Harvey

Elsewhere in the canon the Buddha further elaborates on Jarāmaraṇa (aging and death): (Note: In this translation by John T. Bullit, Bullit leaves the term "dukkha" untranslated. The main article that presents this translation is The Four Noble Truths. (Note: Four Noble Truths Links to each line in the translation are as follows: line 1: First Noble Truth; line 2: Second Noble Truth; line 3: Third Noble Truth; line 4: Fourth Noble Truth.))

"And what is aging? Whatever aging, decrepitude, brokenness, graying, wrinkling, decline of life-force, weakening of the faculties of the various beings in this or that group of beings, that is called aging.

"And what is death? Whatever deceasing, passing away, breaking up, disappearance, dying, death, completion of time, break up of the aggregates, casting off of the body, interruption in the life faculty of the various beings in this or that group of beings, that is called death."

== Within the twelve links of dependent origination ==
The 12 Nidānas:
Ignorance
↓
Formations
↓
Consciousness
↓
Name & Form
↓
Six Sense Bases
↓
Contact
↓
Feeling
↓
Craving
↓
Clinging
↓
Becoming
↓
Birth
↓
Old Age & Death

Jarāmaraṇa is the last of the Twelve Nidānas, directly conditioned by birth (jāti), meaning that all who are born are destined to age and die.

== Texts ==
In the Buddhist Pali Canon's "Subjects for Contemplation Discourse" (Upajjhatthana Sutta, AN 5.57), the Buddha enjoins followers to reflect often on the following:

I am subject to aging, have not gone beyond aging....
I am subject to illness, have not gone beyond illness....
I am subject to death, have not gone beyond death....

In the Pali Canon, aging and death affect all beings, including gods, humans, animals and those born in a hell realm. Only beings who achieve enlightenment (bodhi) in this lifetime escape rebirth in this cycle of birth-and-death (saṃsāra).

As what the Buddha instructed King Pasenadi of Kosala about aging and death in the Pabbatopama Sutta (SN 3.25):

Like massive boulders,
mountains pressing against the sky,
moving in from all sides,
crushing the four directions,
so aging and death
come rolling over living beings:
noble warriors, brahmins, merchants,
workers, outcastes, & scavengers.
They spare nothing.
They trample everything.

So a wise person seeing his own good,
steadfast, secures confidence
in the Buddha, Dhamma, & Sangha.

One who practices the Dhamma in thought, word, & deed,
receives praise here on earth and after death rejoices in heaven.

The Dhammapada has one chapter known as "Jaravagga", that consisted of eleven verses about old age, (from verse 146 to 156).

== See also ==
- Pāli Canon
- Dhammacakkappavattana Sutta
- Upajjhatthana Sutta
- Four Noble Truths
- Dukkha
- Maranasati
- Paticca-samuppada
- Parinibbana
- Patikulamanasikara
- Rebirth (Buddhism)
- Samsara
- Twelve Nidanas

== Sources ==
- Bodhi, Bhikkhu (1980). Transcendental Dependent Arising: A Translation and Exposition of the Upanisa Sutta (Wheel Nos. 277-278). Kandy: Buddhist Publication Society. Retrieved 18 Nov 2008 from "Access to Insight" (1995) at Transcendental Dependent Arising: A Translation and Exposition of the Upanisa Sutta.
- Piyadassi Thera (trans.) (1999). Dhammacakkappavattana Sutta: Setting in Motion the Wheel of Truth (SN 56.11). Retrieved 2007-06-13 from "Access to Insight" at Dhammacakkappavattana Sutta: Setting in Motion the Wheel of Truth.
- Thanissaro Bhikkhu (trans.) (1997b). Upajjhatthana Sutta: Subjects for Contemplation (AN 5.57). Retrieved 18 Nov 2008 from "Access to Insight" at Upajjhatthana Sutta: Subjects for Contemplation.
- Thanissaro Bhikkhu (trans.) (1997). Pabbatopama Sutta: The Simile of the Mountains (SN 3.25). Retrieved 7 Nov 2020 from "Access to Insight" at Pabbatopama Sutta: The Simile of the Mountains
- Thanissaro Bhikkhu (trans.) (1998b). Sona: Mother of Ten (Thig 5.8). Retrieved 18 Nov 2008 from "Access to Insight" at Sona: Mother of Ten.
- Thanissaro Bhikkhu (trans.) (2000). Maha-satipatthana Sutta: The Great Frames of Reference (DN 22). Retrieved 2007-06-20 from "Access to Insight" at Maha-satipatthana Sutta: The Great Frames of Reference.
- Ajahn Sumedho (2002), The Four Noble Truths, Amaravati Publications
- Ajahn Sucitto (2010), Turning the Wheel of Truth: Commentary on the Buddha's First Teaching, Shambhala
- Bhikkhu, Thanissaro (1997), Tittha Sutta: Sectarians, AN 3.61
- Bodhi, Bhikkhu (2000), The Connected Discourses of the Buddha: A New Translation of the Samyutta Nikaya, Boston: Wisdom Publications, ISBN 0-86171-331-1
- Brahm, Ajahn (2006), Mindfulness, Bliss, and Beyond: A Meditator's Handbook, Wisdom Publications, ISBN 0-86171-275-7

Preceded by Jāti	Twelve Nidānas; Jarāmaraṇa	Succeeded by Avidyā
