= Namarupa =

Used in Buddhism and Hinduism to refer to the constituents of a living being

Translations of Nāmarūpa
- Sanskrit: Nāmarūpa
- Burmese: နာမရူပ (MLCTS: nàma̰jùpa̰)
- Chinese: 名色 (Pinyin: míngsè)
- Japanese: 名色 (Rōmaji: myōshiki)
- Korean: 명색 (RR: myeongsaek)
- Sinhala: නාමරූප
- Tagalog: namalupa
- Tibetan: ཎམརུཔ་ ming.gzugs
- Thai: นามรูป (RTGS: nammarup)
- Vietnamese: danh sắc

Nāmarūpa (Sanskrit: नामरूप) is used in Buddhism and Hinduism to refer to the constituents of a living being: nāma is typically considered to refer to the mental component of the person, while rūpa refers to the physical.

In Buddhism, nāmarūpa is most often found as a single compound word understood literally as mind-and-matter or mentality-and-materiality.

In Hinduism, nāma (name) and rūpa (form) is the simple worldly identity of any form by a name both of which are considered temporal and not true identity with the nameless and formless ‘reality’ or ‘Absolute’ in Hinduism that has manifested as maya.

== In Buddhism ==
The 12 Nidānas:
Ignorance
↓
Formations
↓
Consciousness
↓
Name & Form
↓
Six Sense Bases
↓
Contact
↓
Feeling
↓
Craving
↓
Clinging
↓
Becoming
↓
Birth
↓
Old Age & Death

This term is used in Buddhism to refer to the constituents of a living being: nāma refers to the mental, while rūpa refers to the physical. The Buddhist nāma and rūpa are mutually dependent, and not separable; as nāmarūpa, they designate an individual being (or distinct things). (Note: For example, Rhys Davids & Stede (1921-25), p. 350, entry for "Nāma" (retrieved 2007-06-20), states: "nāma as metaphysical term is opposed to rūpa, & comprises the 4 immaterial factors of an individual (arūpino khandhā, viz. vedanā saññā sankhāra viññāṇa...). These as the noëtic principle comb[ine]d with the material principle make up the individual as it is distinguished by 'name & body' from other individuals. Thus nāmarūpa= individuality, individual being. These two are inseparable....") Namarupa are also referred to as the five skandhas, "the psycho-physical organism", “mind-and-matter,” and “mentality-and-materiality”.

=== Psycho-physical constituents ===
In the Pali Canon, the Buddha describes nāmarūpa in this manner (English on left, Pali on right):

"And what [monks] is name-&-form? Feeling, perception, intention, contact, & attention: This is called name. The four great elements, and the form dependent on the four great elements: This is called form. This name & this form are, [monks], called name-&-form."

Katamañca bhikkhave nāmarūpaṃ? Vedanā saññā cetanā phasso manasikāro, idaṃ vuccati nāmaṃ. Cattāro ca mahābhūtā, catunnaṃ ca mahābhūtānaṃ upādāyarūpaṃ, idaṃ vuccati rūpaṃ. Iti idañca nāmaṃ, idañca rūpaṃ, idaṃ vuccati bhikkhave, nāmarūpaṃ.

Elsewhere in the Pali Canon, nāmarūpa is used synonymously with the five aggregates. or as the process of perception in modern interpretation.

=== Empty of self ===
In keeping with the doctrine of anātman/anatta, "the absence of an (enduring, essential) self", nāma and rūpa are held to be constantly in a state of flux, with only the continuity of experience (itself a product of dependent origination) providing an experience of any sort of conventional 'self'.

=== Part of the cycle of suffering ===
Nāmarūpa is the fourth of the Twelve Nidānas, preceded by consciousness (Pali: viññāna; Skt.: vijñana) and followed by the six sense bases (Pali: saḷāyatana; Skt: ṣaḍāyatana). Thus, in the Sutta Nipata, the Buddha explains to the Ven. Ajita how samsaric rebirth ceases:

[Ven. Ajita:]
...name & form, dear sir:
Tell me, when asked this,
where are they brought to a halt?

[The Buddha:]
This question you've asked, Ajita,
I'll answer it for you —
where name & form
are brought to a halt
without trace:
With the cessation of consciousness
they're brought
to a halt. (Note: Thanissaro (1994). Archived 2014-12-26 at the Wayback Machine In explaining this specific exchange between Ven. Ajita and the Buddha, Ireland (1983, 1994), n. 2 Archived 2014-08-12 at the Wayback Machine states: This question and answer refers to the doctrine of dependent-arising (paticca-samuppada). Where rebirth-consciousness (pati-sandhi-vinnana) does not arise there is no establishment of an individual (mind-and-body, namarupa) in a realm of existence, nor the consequent appearance of old age and death and the other sufferings inherent in life.)

== In Hinduism ==
The term nāmarūpa is used in Hindu thought, nāma describing the spiritual or essential properties of an object or being, and rūpa the physical presence that it manifests. These terms are used similarly to the way that 'essence' and 'accident' are used in Catholic theology to describe transubstantiation. The distinction between nāma and rūpa in Hindu thought explains the ability of spiritual powers to manifest through inadequate or inanimate vessels - as observed in possession and oracular phenomena, as well as in the presence of the divine in images that are worshiped through pūja.

Nāma Rupatmak Vishva is the Vedanta (a school of Sanatana Dharma/Hinduism) term for the manifest Universe, viz. The World as we know it. Since every object in this World has a Nāma and Rupa, the World is called Nāma Rupatmak Vishva. The Paramātma (or Creator) is not manifest in this Nāma Rupatmak Vishva but is realized by a Sādhaka(student) by means of Bhakti (devotion), Karma (action), Jnana (knowledge), Yoga (Union, a Hindu school), or a combination of all of these methodologies.

== See also ==
- Bodymind
- Pratitya-samutpada (Sanskrit; Pali: paticca-samuppāda; English: dependent arising)
- Skandha (Sanskrit; Pali: khandha; English: aggregates)

== Bibliography ==
- Ireland, John D. (trans.) (1983). Ajita-manava-puccha: Ajita's Questions (Sn 5.1), from The Discourse Collection: Selected Texts from the Sutta Nipata (WH 82). Kandy: Buddhist Publication Society. Retrieved 2007-06-20 from "Access to Insight" (1994) at https://web.archive.org/web/20140812121236/http://www.accesstoinsight.org/tipitaka/kn/snp/snp.5.01.irel.html.
- Rhys Davids, T.W. & William Stede (eds.) (1921-5). The Pali Text Society’s Pali–English Dictionary. Chipstead: Pali Text Society. A general on-line search engine for the PED is available at http://dsal.uchicago.edu/dictionaries/pali/.
- Sri Lanka Buddha Jayanti Tipitaka Series (SLTP) (n.d.). Buddhavaggo (SN 12.1). Retrieved 2007-06-20 from "METTANET - LANKA" at http://metta.lk/tipitaka/2Sutta-Pitaka/3Samyutta-Nikaya/Samyutta2/12-Abhisamaya-Samyutta/01-Buddhavaggo-p.html Archived 2018-08-29 at the Wayback Machine.
- Thanissaro Bhikkhu (trans.) (1994). Ajita-manava-puccha: Ajita's Questions (Sn 5.1). Retrieved 2007-06-20 from "Access to Insight" at https://web.archive.org/web/20141226013717/http://www.accesstoinsight.org/tipitaka/kn/snp/snp.5.01.than.html.
- Thanissaro Bhikkhu (trans.) (1997). Paticca-samuppada-vibhanga Sutta: Analysis of Dependent Co-arising (SN 12.2). Retrieved 2007-06-20 from "Access to Insight" at https://web.archive.org/web/20060512063953/http://www.accesstoinsight.org/canon/sutta/samyutta/sn-12-002-tb0.html.

Preceded by Vijñāna	Twelve Nidānas; Nāmarūpa	Succeeded by Ṣaḍāyatana
