= Sankhata =

Buddhist concept of "compounded phenomenona"

Translations of Sankhata
- English: conditioned, fabricated, compounded
- Sanskrit: संस्कृत (Saṃskṛta)
- Chinese: 有為 (Pinyin: yǒu wéi)
- Japanese: 有為 (Rōmaji: ui)
- Korean: 유위 (RR: yuwi)
- Tibetan: འདུས་བྱས ('dus byas)
- Vietnamese: hữu vi

Saṅkhata (Sanskrit: Saṃskṛta संस्कृत) refers to any phenomena conditioned by other phenomena produced through causes. Sankhata is contrasted with Asankhata, which means Unconditioned (that which is of its own without any dependence on conditioned phenomena) referring to Nibbana.

== See also ==
- Sankhara
- Twelve Nidanas
- Anicca
- Five Skandhas
