= Taṇhā =

Buddhist concept of craving and greed

Translations of taṇhā
- English: thirst, craving, desire, etc.
- Sanskrit: tṛ́ṣṇā (Dev: तृष्णा)
- Pali: taṇhā
- Bengali: টান (Tan)
- Burmese: တဏှာ (MLCTS: tən̥à)
- Chinese: 貪愛 / 贪爱 (Pinyin: tānài)
- Indonesian: nafsu, nafsu kahausan, nafsu keinginan, keserakahan, ketamakan
- Japanese: 渇愛 (Rōmaji: katsu ai)
- Khmer: តណ្ហា (UNGEGN: tânha)
- Korean: 갈애 (RR: gal-ae)
- Sinhala: තණ්හාව,තෘෂ්ණාව
- Tagalog: tanha
- Tibetan: སྲེད་པ་ (Wylie: sred pa; THL: sepa)
- Thai: ตัณหา (IPA: tan-hăː)
- Vietnamese: ái

The 12 Nidānas:
Ignorance
↓
Formations
↓
Consciousness
↓
Name & Form
↓
Six Sense Bases
↓
Contact
↓
Feeling
↓
Craving
↓
Clinging
↓
Becoming
↓
Birth
↓
Old Age & Death

Taṇhā (from Pāli; Sanskrit: तृष्णा, romanized: tṛ́ṣṇā Sanskrit pronunciation: [tr̩ʂɳaː]) is an important concept in Buddhism, referring to "thirst, desire, longing, greed", either physical or mental. It is typically translated as craving, and is of three types: kāma-taṇhā (craving for sensual pleasures), bhava-taṇhā (craving for existence), and vibhava-taṇhā (craving for non-existence).

Taṇhā appears in the Four Noble Truths, wherein taṇhā arises with, or exists together with, dukkha (dissatisfaction, "standing unstable") and the cycle of repeated birth, becoming and death (saṃsāra).

In the Theravāda Abhidhamma teachings, taṇhā is equivalent to the mental factor lobha (attachment).

== Etymology and meaning ==
Taṇhā is a Pali word, derived from the Vedic Sanskrit word tṛ́ṣṇā (तृष्णा), which originates from the Proto-Indo-Iranian *tŕ̥šnas, which is related to the root tarś- (thirst, desire, wish), ultimately descending from Proto-Indo-European *ters- (dry).

The word has the following Indo-European cognates: Avestan taršna (thirst), Ancient Greek térsomai (to dry), Lithuanian troškimas (thirst, desire), Gothic þaursus (dry), Old High German durst (thirst), English thirst. The word appears numerous times in the Samhita layer of the Rigveda, dated to the 2nd millennium BCE, such as in hymns 1.7.11, 1.16.5, 3.9.3, 6.15.5, 7.3.4 and 10.91.7. It also appears in other Vedas, wherein the meaning of the word is "thirst, thirsting for, longing for, craving for, desiring, eager greediness, and suffering from thirst".

== Relation to dukkha ==
In the second of the Four Noble Truths, the Buddha identified taṇhā as arising together with dukkha (unease, "standing unstable").

Taṇhā, states Walpola Rahula, or "thirst, desire, greed, craving" is what manifests as suffering and rebirths. However, adds Rahula, it is not the first cause nor the only cause of dukkha or saṃsāra, because the origination of everything is relative and dependent on something else. The Pali canons of Buddhism assert other defilements and impurities (kilesā, sāsavā dhammā), in addition to taṇhā, as the cause of Dukkha. Taṇhā nevertheless, is always listed first, and considered the principal, all-pervading and "the most palpable and immediate cause" of dukkha, states Rahula.

Taṇhā, states Peter Harvey, is the key origin of dukkha in Buddhism. It reflects a mental state of craving. Greater the craving, more is the frustration because the world is always changing and innately unsatisfactory; craving also brings about pain through conflict and quarrels between individuals, which are all a state of dukkha. It is such taṇhā that leads to rebirth and endless saṃsāra, stated Buddha as the second reality, and it is marked by three types of craving: sensory, being or non-existence. In Buddhist philosophy, there are right view and wrong view. The wrong views ultimately trace back to taṇhā, but it also asserts that "ordinary right view" such as giving and donations to monks, is also a form of clinging. The end of taṇhā occurs when a person has accepted the "transcendent right view" through insight into impermanence and non-self.

Both appropriate and inappropriate tendencies, states Stephen Laumakis, are linked to the fires of taṇhā, and these produce fruits of kamma thereby rebirths. Quenching and blowing out these fires completely, is the path to final release from dukkha and saṃsāra, in Buddhism. The Pali texts, states David Webster, repeatedly recommend that one must destroy taṇhā completely, and this destruction is necessary for nirvāṇa.

Taṇhā is also identified as the eighth link in the twelve links of dependent origination. In the context of the twelve links, the emphasis is on the types of craving "that nourish the karmic potency that will produce the next lifetime."

== Types ==
The Buddha identified three types of taṇhā: (Note: Pali discourses that use this three-fold typology include DN 15, DN 22, MN 44, SN 22.22, SN 22.103, SN 22.104, SN 22.105, SN 38.10, SN 39.10, SN 45.170, SN 56.11, SN 56.13 and SN 56.14.)

- Kāma-taṇhā (sensual pleasures craving): craving for sense objects which provide pleasant feeling, or craving for sensory pleasures. Walpola Rahula states that taṇhā includes not only desire for sense-pleasures, wealth and power, but also "desire for, and attachment to, ideas and ideals, views, opinions, theories, conceptions and beliefs (dhamma-taṇhā)."
- Bhava-taṇhā (craving for being): craving to be something, to unite with an experience. This is ego-related, states Harvey, the seeking of certain identity and desire for certain type of rebirth eternally. Other scholars explain that this type of craving is driven by the wrong view of eternalism (eternal life) and about permanence.
- Vibhava-taṇhā (craving for non-existence): craving not to experience unpleasant things in the current or future life, such as unpleasant people or situations. This sort of craving may include attempts at suicide and self-annihilation, and this only results in further rebirth in a worse realm of existence. This type of craving, states Phra Thepyanmongkol, is driven by the wrong view of annihilationism, that there is no rebirth.

== Cessation of taṇhā ==
The third noble truth teaches that the cessation of taṇhā is possible. The Dhammacakkappavattana Sutta states:

Bhikkhus, there is a noble truth about the cessation of suffering. It is the complete fading away and cessation of this craving [taṇhā]; its abandonment and relinquishment; getting free from and being independent of it.

Cessation of taṇhā can be obtained by following the Noble Eightfold Path. In Theravada Buddhism, the cessation results from the gaining of true insight into impermanence and non-self. The 'insight meditation' practice of Buddhism, states Kevin Trainor, focuses on gaining "right mindfulness" which entails understanding three marks of existence - dukkha (suffering), anicca (impermanence) and anatta (non-self). The understanding of the reality of non-self, adds Trainor, promotes non-attachment because "if there is no soul, then there is no locus for clinging". Once one comprehends and accepts the non-self doctrine, there are no more desires, i.e. taṇhā ceases.

== Taṇhā versus chanda ==
Buddhism categorizes desires as either taṇhā or chanda. Chanda literally means "impulse, excitement, will, desire for".

Bahm states that chanda is "desiring what, and no more than, will be attained", while taṇhā is "desiring more than will be attained". However, in early Buddhist texts, adds Bahm, the term chanda includes anxieties and is ambiguous, wherein five kinds of chanda are described, namely "to seek, to gain, to hoard, to spend and to enjoy". In these early texts, the sense of the word chanda is the same as taṇhā.

Some writers such as Ajahn Sucitto explain chanda as positive and non-pathological, asserting it to be distinct from negative and pathological taṇhā. Sucitto explains it with examples such as the desire to apply oneself to a positive action such as meditation. In contrast, Rhys Davids and Stede state that chanda, in Buddhist texts, has both positive and negative connotations; as a vice, for example, the Pali texts associate chanda with "lust, delight in the body" stating it to be a source of misery.

Chanda, states Peter Harvey, can be either wholesome or unwholesome.

== Relation to the three poisons ==
Taṇhā (desire) can be related to the three poisons:

- Avijjā (avidyā) or moha (ignorance), the root of the three poisons, is also the basis for taṇhā.
- Rāga (attachment) is equivalent to bhava-taṇhā (craving to be) and kāma-taṇhā (sense-craving).
- Dosa (dveṣa) (aversion) is equivalent to vibhava-taṇhā (craving not to be).

According to Rupert Gethin, taṇhā is related to aversion and ignorance. Craving leads to aversion, anger, cruelty and violence, states Gethin, which are unpleasant states and cause suffering to one who craves. Craving is based on misjudgement, states Gethin, that the world is permanent, unchanging, stable, and reliable.

For example, in the first discourse of the Buddha, the Buddha identified taṇhā as the principal cause of suffering. However, his third discourse, the Fire Sermon, and other suttas, the Buddha identifies the causes of suffering as the "fires" of rāga, dosa (dveṣa), and moha; in the Fire Sermon, the Buddha states that nirvāṇa is obtained by extinguishing these fires.

== See also ==
- Avidyā (Buddhism)
- Buddhism and psychology
- Chanda (Buddhism)
- Kleshas (Buddhism)
- Three poisons (Buddhism)
- Twelve Nidanas
- Upādāna

== Notes ==
Preceded by Vedanā	Twelve Nidānas; Tṛṣṇā	Succeeded by Upādāna
