= Jāti (Buddhism) =

Physical birth In Buddhism

Translations of Jāti
- English: birth
- Sanskrit: जाति
- Pali: Jāti
- Burmese: ဇာတိ (MLCTS: zàtḭ)
- Chinese: 生 (Pinyin: shēng)
- Japanese: 生 (Rōmaji: shō)
- Khmer: ជាតិ (UNGEGN: chéatĕ)
- Shan: ၸႃႇတီႉ ([tsaa2 ti5])
- Sinhala: ජාති
- Tibetan: skyed.ba
- Tagalog: kati
- Thai: ชาติ (RTGS: chat)
- Vietnamese: sinh

In Buddhism, Jāti (Sanskrit/Pāli), "birth", refers to physical birth; to rebirth, the arising of a new living entity within saṃsāra (cyclic existence); and to the arising of mental phenomena.

== Meaning ==
Within the teachings on the Four Noble Truths, jāti refers to physical birth, and is qualified as dukkha (suffering): "Now this, monks, is the noble truth of dukkha: birth (jati) is dukkha, aging is dukkha, death is dukkha."

In traditional Buddhist thought, there are four forms of birth:

- birth from an egg (Sanskrit: Andaja; Pali: Aṇḍaja; Chinese: 卵生; Standard Tibetan: Sgongskyes)—like a bird, fish, or reptile;
- birth from a womb (Sanskrit: Jarayuja; Pali: Jalābuja; Chinese: 胎生; Standard Tibetan: Mnal-skyes)—like most mammals and some worldly devas;
- birth from moisture (Sanskrit: Samsvedaja; Pali: Saṃsedaja; Chinese: 濕生; Standard Tibetan: Drod-skyes)—probably referring to the appearance of animals whose eggs are microscopic, like maggots appearing in rotting flesh;
- birth by transformation (Sanskrit: Upapaduka; Pali: Opapatika; Chinese: 化生; Standard Tibetan: Rdzus-skyes)—miraculous materialization, as with the devas.

The 12 Nidānas:
Ignorance
↓
Formations
↓
Consciousness
↓
Name & Form
↓
Six Sense Bases
↓
Contact
↓
Feeling
↓
Craving
↓
Clinging
↓
Becoming
↓
Birth
↓
Old Age & Death

Jāti is the eleventh link within the eleventh Nidāna of paṭiccasamuppāda ("dependent arising" or "dependent origination"), where it can refer both to rebirth and to the arising of mental phenomena. The Vibhanga, the second book of the Theravada Abbidhamma, treats it in both ways. In the Suttantabhajaniya it is described as rebirth, which is conditioned by becoming (bhava), and gives rise to old age and death (jarāmaraṇa) in a living being. In the Abhidhammabhajaniya it is treated as the arising of mental phenomena.

== Sources ==
- Analayo (2007), "Rebirth and the Gandhabba" (PDF), Journal of Buddhist Studies 1: 91-105

Preceded by Bhava	Twelve Nidānas; Jāti	Succeeded by Jarāmaraṇa
