= Āyatana =

Buddhist term for the six senses

Translations of ṣaḍāyatana
- English: six cognitive functions, six sense bases, six sense spheres
- Sanskrit: ṣaḍāyatana
- Pali: saḷāyatana
- Chinese: 六入, 六処 (Pinyin: liùrù)
- Japanese: 六入, 六処 (Rōmaji: rokunyū, rokusho)
- Korean: 육입, 육처 (RR: yuk-yip, yuk-tcher)
- Tagalog: ayatana
- Tibetan: skye.mched
- Thai: อายตนะ (RTGS: ayatana)
- Vietnamese: lục nhập

In Buddhism, āyatana (Pāli; Sanskrit: आयतन) is a "center of experience" or "mental home," which create one's experience. The related term saḷāyatana (Pāli; Skt. ṣaḍāyatana) refers to six cognitive functions, namely sight, hearing, smelling, tasting, body-cognition, and mind-cognition.

Āyatana may refer to both ordinary experience and the chain of processes leading to bondage, as to awakened experience centered in detachment and meditative accomplishment. The Buddhist path aims to relocate one from the ordinary, sensual centers of experience to the "mental home" of the purified, liberated awareness of the jhanas.

Traditionally, the term āyatana is translated as "sense base", "sense-media" or "sense sphere," (Note: "Sense base" is used for instance by Bodhi (2000b) and Soma (1999). "Sense-media" is used by Thanissaro (e.g., cf. [http://www.accesstoinsight.org/tipitaka/mn/mn.149.than.html Thanissaro, 1998c]). "Sense sphere" is used for instance by VRI (1996) and suggested by {{Deprecated archive|url=https://archive.today/20120707190050/http://dsal.uchicago.edu/cgi-bin/philologic/getobject.pl?c.0:1:2840.pali|title=Rhys Davids & Stede (1921–5), p. 105}}, whose third definition for Āyatana is: sphere of perception or sense in general, object of thought, sense-organ & object; relation, order. – [Aung & Rhys Davids (1910)], p. 183 says rightly: 'āyatana cannot be rendered by a single English word to cover both sense-organs (the mind being regarded as 6th sense) and sense objects'. – These āyatanāni (relations, functions, reciprocalities) are thus divided into two groups, inner (ajjhattikāni) and outer (bāhirāni)....) due to the influence of later commentators like Buddhaghosa. The saḷāyatana are traditionally understood as referring to the five senses and the mind. (Note: Mano: The Pāli word translated here as "mind" is mano. Other common translations include "intellect" (e.g., Thanissaro, 2001a) and "consciousness" (e.g., Soma, 1999). In the Suttapitaka, mano does not necessarily refer to all mental processing. Other oft-mentioned complementary mental processes include "consciousness" (viññāṇa) and "mental states" (citta). Nonetheless, in the Abhidhamma Pitaka and later texts, these terms are at times used synonymously.; Buddhism and other Indian epistemologies identify six 'centers of experience', conventionally interpreted as "senses"; as such the number differs from the Western identification of five senses. In Buddhism, "mind" denotes a 'center of experience', conventionally interpreted as an 'internal sense organ', which interacts with sense objects, including sense impressions, feelings, perceptions and volition, all belonging to the five skandhas. See, for instance, Bodhi (2000a, p. 288), and Hamilton (2001), p. 53: "... six senses, including one relating to non-sensory mental activity, are recognized in Buddhism and other Indian schools of thought." Pine (2004, p. 101) argues that this scheme probably predates Buddhism, because it has ten external members (ear, sound, nose, odor, tongue, taste, body, touch) corresponding to the single external skandha (form), and only two internal members (mind and thought) corresponding to the four internal skandhas.)

== Etymology ==
Āyatana (Pāli; Sanskrit: आयतन) is a Buddhist term that does not have a single definition or meaning. The standard PTS Pāli-English Dictionary by Davids & Stede (1921) gives the following meanings of āyatana:

1. . stretch, extent, reach, compass, region; sphere, locus, place, spot; position, occasion
2. . exertion, doing, working, practice, performance
3. . sphere of perception or sense in general, object of thought, sense-organ & object; relation, order

While āyatana is usually translated as "base" or "sphere," or more specifically as "sense field," "sense base", "sense-media" or "sense sphere," according to Ellis, "these are inadequate translations because they are based on later Buddhist traditions and commentarial literature and not on an historical understanding of the term."

In Vedic literature āyatana is "used for a regular place, position, etc. occupied by a person." In some Upanishads it refers to a "dwelling place" or "resort," or a "resting place for the mind," indicating that āyatana means "the place in which experience happens" or a "center of experience." According to Ellis, "center of experience" or "mental home" is a more adequate interpretation than "base" or "sphere."

Ellis notes that āyatana in the suttas most commonly appears in compound form, namely saḷāyatana or cha phassāyatanā, the "six āyatanas of sensual experience." According to Ellis, "This context is so dominant that translators like Bodhi and Walshe translate ‘sense bases’ even if the Pāli texts only mentions āyatana, and not saḷāyatana."

Ellis further notes that saḷāyatana is traditionally interpreted anatomically, and understood as referring to the five senses and the mind. Yet, according to Olivelle, saḷāyatana refers instead to cognitive functions, (Note: Olivelle, The Early Upanishads: "In dealing with sight and hearing … [the early upanishads] clearly distinguish the power or the act of seeing and hearing from the respective external organs, the eyes and the ears. Indeed, they consistently use different Sanskrit terms for the two—cakṣus and śrotra for sight and hearing, and akṣan and karṇa for eye and ear, respectively..") and is therefore understood by Ellis as referring to sight, hearing, smelling, tasting, body-cognition, and mind-cognition.

== In the Pali Canon ==
Throughout the Pali Canon, the saḷāyatana are referenced in hundreds of discourses. (Note: >The greatest concentration of discourses related to the saḷāyatana is in the Samyutta Nikaya, chapter 35, entitled "The Book of the Six Sense Bases" (Saḷāyatana-vagga). For instance, in Bodhi (2000b) edition of the Samyutta Nikaya, this chapter alone has 248 discourses. The Rhys Davids & Stede (1921–25) entry for "Āyatana" (p. 105) also mentions other discourses in each of the Pali nikayas.) In these diverse discourses, the sense bases are integrated in various mnemonic lists.

=== Internal and external āyatana ===
Figure 1: The Pali Canon's Six Sextets:

sense bases (āyatana)

→

feeling ︵vedanā︶

→

craving ︵taṇhā︶

"internal"
sense
organs
<–>
"external"
sense
objects

↓
↓
↓
contact (phassa)
↓
↑

consciousness (viññāṇa)

1. The six internal sense bases are the eye, ear,
  nose, tongue, body & mind.
2. The six external sense bases are visible forms,
  sound, odor, flavors, touch & mental objects.
3. Sense-specific consciousness arises dependent
  on an internal & an external sense base.
4. Contact is the meeting of an internal sense
  base, external sense base & consciousness.
5. Feeling is dependent on contact.
6. Craving is dependent on feeling.
Source: MN 148 (Thanissaro, 1998) diagram details

The āyatana are further refined as six internal āyatana (Note: (Pali: ajjhattikāni āyatanāni; also known as, "organs", "gates", "doors", "powers" or "roots") and six corresponding external āyatana. (Note: Bāhirāni āyatanāni or "sense objects"; also known as vishaya or "domains.") Together they form: (Note: Saḷāyatana is generally used in the context of the Twelve Causes (nidāna) of the chain of Dependent Origination; see [https://dsal.uchicago.edu/cgi-bin/philologic/getobject.pl?c.3:1:3909.pali Rhys Davids & Stede (1921–5), p. 699.]. Ṣaḍāyatana is the fifth link in the Twelve Nidānas of Pratitya-Samutpada (Dependent Origination) and thus likewise in the fifth position on the Bhavacakra (Wheel of Becoming). Ṣaḍāyatana (Sense Gates) is dependent on Nāmarūpa (Name and Form) as condition before it can exist: "With Name and Form as condition, Sense Gates arise." Ṣaḍāyatana is also the prevailing condition for the next condition in the chain, Contact (Sparśa): "With|Sense Gates as condition, Contact arises".)

- sight ('eye') and visible objects (Note: The Pāli word translated here as "visible objects" is rūpa. In terms of the Buddhist notion of the saḷāyatana, rūpa refers to visual objects (or objects knowable by the eye through light). This should not be confused with the use of the word rūpa in terms of the Buddhist notion of aggregates where rūpa refers to all material objects, both of the world and the body. Thus, when comparing these two uses of rūpa, the rūpa aggregate (rūpakkhandha) includes the rūpa sense-object (rūpāyatana) as well as the four other material sense-objects (sound, odor, taste and touch).)
- hearing ('ear') and sound
- smelling ('nose') and odor
- tasting ('tongue') and taste
- body-cognition ('body') and touch
- mind-cognition ('mind') and dharmas (mental objects) (Note: Other frequently seen translations for dharma include "mental phenomena" (e.g., Bodhi, 2000b, pp. 1135ff.), "thoughts," "ideas" (e.g., Thanissaro, 2001a) and "contents of the mind" (VRI, 1996, p. 39) while some translators simply leave this word untranslated due to its complex overtones in the Pali literature.)

The saḷāyatana are related to the indriya, the five senses and the mind; the indriya become saḷāyatana when they are distorted by a defiled mind.Indriya also refers to the five spiritual facultues, which contribute to an awakened state of mind.

=== Five skandhas ===
Based on these six pairs of āyatana, a number of mental factors arise, as described in the five skandhas. Thus, for instance, when the auditive cognitive function ('the ear') is triggered by sound, the associated consciousness (Pali: viññāṇa) arises. With the presence of these three elements ( dhātu) – hearing function, sound and hearing function-related consciousness – "contact" (phassa) arises, which in turn is apprehended as a pleasant or unpleasant or neutral "feeling" or "sensation" (vedanā). With feeling, "craving" (taṇhā) (or aversion) arises. (See Figure 1.)

Such an enumeration can be found, for instance, in the "Six Sextets" discourse (Chachakka Sutta, MN 148), where the "six sextets" (six sense organs, six sense objects, six sense-specific types of consciousness, six sense-specific types of contact, six sense-specific types of sensation and six sense-specific types of craving) are examined and found to be empty of self.

The 12 Nidānas:
Ignorance
↓
Formations
↓
Consciousness
↓
Name & Form
↓
Six Sense Bases
↓
Contact
↓
Feeling
↓
Craving
↓
Clinging
↓
Becoming
↓
Birth
↓
Old Age & Death

The saḷāyatana are included in the Twelve Nidanas, a list compiled of several sublists including the five skandhas, which describes the process of becoming.

=== "The All" ===
In a discourse entitled, "The All" (SN 35.23), the Buddha states that there is no "all" outside of the six pairs of the saḷāyatana. (Note: Bodhi (2000b), p. 1140; and, Thanissaro (2001b). According to Bodhi (2000b), p. 1399, n. 7, the Pali commentary regarding the Sabba Sutta states: "...[I]f one passes over the twelve saḷāyatana, one cannot point out any real phenomenon." Also see Rhys Davids & Stede (1921–25), p. 680, "Sabba" entry where sabbaŋ is defined as "the (whole) world of sense-experience."<) In the next codified discourse (SN 35.24), the Buddha elaborates that the All includes the first five aforementioned sextets (sense organs, objects, consciousness, contact and sensations). References to the All can be found in a number of subsequent discourses. In addition, the Abhidhamma and post-canonical Pali literature further conceptualize the saḷāyatana as a means for classifying all factors of existence.

=== "Aflame with lust, hate and delusion" ===
In "The Vipers" discourse (Asivisa Sutta, SN 35.197), the Buddha likens the internal saḷāyatana to an "empty village" and the external saḷāyatana to "village-plundering bandits." Using this metaphor, the Buddha characterizes the "empty" sense organs as being "attacked by agreeable & disagreeable" sense objects.

the contact between the senses and the sense objects
gives rise to fleeting perceptions of happiness and distress.
Bhagavad Gita 2 : 14

Elsewhere in the same collection of discourses (SN 35.191), the Buddha's Great Disciple Sariputta clarifies that the actual suffering associated with sense organs and sense objects is not inherent to these saḷāyatana but is due to the "fetters" (here identified as "desire and lust") that arise when there is contact between a sense organ and sense object.

In the "Fire Sermon" (Adittapariyaya Sutta, SN 35.28), delivered several months after the Buddha's awakening, the Buddha describes all saḷāyatana and related mental processes in the following manner:

"Monks, the All is aflame. What All is aflame? The eye is aflame. Forms are aflame. Consciousness at the eye is aflame. Contact at the eye is aflame. And whatever there is that arises in dependence on contact at the eye – experienced as pleasure, pain or neither-pleasure-nor-pain – that too is aflame. Aflame with what? Aflame with the fire of passion, the fire of aversion, the fire of delusion. Aflame, I tell you, with birth, aging & death, with sorrows, lamentations, pains, distresses, & despairs."

=== Liberation ===
The Buddha taught that, in order to escape the dangers of the saḷāyatana, one must be able to apprehend the saḷāyatana without defilement. In "Abandoning the Fetters" (SN 35.54), the Buddha states that one abandons the fetters "when one knows and sees ... as impermanent" (Pali: anicca) the [saḷāyatana], objects, sense-consciousness, contact and sensations. Similarly, in "Uprooting the Fetters" (SN 35.55), the Buddha states that one uproots the fetters "when one knows and sees ... as nonself" (anatta) the aforementioned five sextets.

To foster this type of penetrative knowing and seeing and the resultant release from suffering, in the Satipatthana Sutta (MN 10) the Buddha instructs monks to meditate on the saḷāyatana and the dependently arising fetters as follows:

"How, O bhikkhus, does a bhikkhu live contemplating mental object in the mental objects of the six internal and the six external sense-bases?
"Here, O bhikkhus, a bhikkhu understands the eye and material forms and the fetter that arises dependent on both (eye and forms); he understands how the arising of the non-arisen fetter comes to be; he understands how the abandoning of the arisen fetter comes to be; and he understands how the non-arising in the future of the abandoned fetter comes to be. [In a similar manner:] He understands the ear and sounds ... the organ of smell and odors ... the organ of taste and flavors ... the organ of touch and tactual objects ... the consciousness and mental objects....
"Thus he lives contemplating mental object in mental objects ... and clings to naught in the world."

In the Four Noble Truths, one of many summaries of the Buddhist path to liberation, dukkha ('suffering') is observed to arise with craving (Pali: taṇhā; Skt.: tṛṣṇā, lit. 'thirst'). In the chain of Dependent Origination, craving arises with sensations when the saḷāyatana is activated by contact. To detach from tanha and dukkha, one should develop awareness (sati (mindfullness) and sampajañña (clear comprehension)) of the chain of events triggered by the saḷāyatana, and practice restraint and detachment (sammā-vāyāma (right effort) and dhyana ('meditation')). (Note: Bodhi (2005b), starting at time 50:00. Bodhi (2005b) references, for instance, Majjhima Nikaya Sutta No. 149, where the Buddha instructs: "...[K]nowing & seeing the eye as it actually is present, knowing & seeing [visible] forms... consciousness at the eye... contact at the eye as they actually are present, knowing & seeing whatever arises conditioned through contact at the eye – experienced as pleasure, pain, or neither-pleasure-nor-pain – as it actually is present, one is not infatuated with the eye... forms... consciousness at the eye... contact at the eye... whatever arises.... The craving that makes for further becoming – accompanied by passion & delight, relishing now this & now that – is abandoned by him. His bodily disturbances & mental disturbances are abandoned. His bodily torments & mental torments are abandoned. His bodily distresses & mental distresses are abandoned. He is sensitive both to ease of body & ease of awareness..." (Thanissaro, 1998c).)

Ellis notes that āyatana may also refer to the various stages of meditation (jhana), and "even the state of liberated Buddhist masters is termed āyatana."' As such, they are also a "center of experience" or "mental home," in which our normal states of mind are abandoned and one relocates in the purified, liberated awareness of the jhanas.

== In post-canonical Pali texts ==
The Vimuttimagga, the Visuddhimagga, and associated Pali commentaries and subcommentaries all contribute to traditional knowledge about the saḷāyatana.

=== Understanding sense organs ===
When the Buddha speaks of "understanding" the eye, ear, nose, tongue and body, what is meant?

According to the first-century CE Sinhalese meditation manual, Vimuttimagga, the sense organs can be understood in terms of the object sensed, the consciousness aroused, the underlying "sensory matter," and an associated primary or derived element that is present "in excess." These characteristics are summarized in the table below.

sense organ	sense object	sense consciousness	sensory matter	element in excess
eye	visual objects	visual consciousness	"...the three small fleshy discs round the pupil, and the white and black of the eye-ball that is in five layers of flesh, blood, wind, phlegm and serum, is half a poppy-seed in size, is like the head of a louseling...."	Earth
ear	sound waves	auditory consciousness	"...in the interior of the two ear-holes, is fringed by tawny hair, is dependent on the membrane, is like the stem of a blue-green bean...."	Sounds
nose	odors	olfactory consciousness	"...in the interior of the nose, where the three meet, is dependent on one small opening, is like a Koviḷāra (flower in shape)...."	air
tongue	tastes	gustatory consciousness	"...two-finger breadths in size, is in shape like a blue lotus, is located in the flesh of the tongue...."	water
body	tangibles	tactual consciousness	"...in the entire body, excepting the hair of the body and the head, nails teeth and other insensitive parts...."	Heat (or lack thereof)
Table 1. The Vimuttimagga's characterization of sense organs.

The compendious fifth-century CE Visuddhimagga provides similar descriptors, such as "the size of a mere louse's head" for the location of the eye's "sensitivity" (Pali: pasāda; also known as, "sentient organ, sense agency, sensitive surface"), and "in the place shaped like a goat's hoof" regarding the nose sensitivity (Vsm. XIV, 47–52). In addition, the Visuddhimagga describes the sense organs in terms of the following four factors:

- characteristic or sign (lakkhaṇa)
- function or "taste" (rasa)
- manifestation (paccupaṭṭhāna)
- proximate cause (padaṭṭhāna)

Thus, for instance, it describes the eye as follows:

Herein, the eye's characteristic is sensitivity of primary elements that is ready for the impact of visible data; or its characteristic is sensitivity of primary elements originated by kamma sourcing from desire to see. Its function is to pick up [an object] among visible data. It is manifested as the footing of eye-consciousness. Its proximate cause is primary elements born of kamma sourcing from desire to see.

In regards to the sixth internal āyatana of mind (mano), Pali subcommentaries (attributed to Dhammapāla Thera) distinguish between consciousness arising from the five physical saḷāyatana and that arising from the primarily post-canonical notion of a "life-continuum" or "unconscious mind" (bhavaṅga-mana):

"Of the consciousness or mind aggregate included in a course of cognition of eye-consciousness, just the eye-base [not the mind-base] is the 'door' of origin, and the [external sense] base of the material form is the visible object. So it is in the case of the others [that is, the ear, nose, tongue and body sense bases]. But of the sixth sense-base the part of the mind base called the life-continuum, the unconscious mind, is the 'door' of origin...."

=== The roots of wisdom ===
In the fifth-century CE exegetical Visuddhimagga, Buddhaghosa identifies knowing about the saḷāyatana as part of the "soil" of liberating wisdom. Other components of this "soil" include the aggregates, the faculties, the Four Noble Truths and Dependent Origination.

== Related Buddhist concepts ==
- Aggregates (Pali, khandha; Skt., skandha):
  In a variety of suttas, the aggregates, elements (see below) and saḷāyatana are identified as the "soil" in which craving and clinging grow. In general, in the Pali Canon, the aggregate of material form includes the five material sense organs (eye, ear, nose, tongue and body) and associated sense objects (visible forms, sounds, odors, tastes and tactile objects); the aggregate of consciousness is associated with the sense organ of mind; and, the mental aggregates (sensation, perception, mental formations) are mental sense objects.
  Both the aggregates and the saḷāyatana are identified as objects of mindfulness meditation in the Satipatthana Sutta. In terms of pursuing liberation, meditating on the aggregates eradicates self-doctrine and wrong-view clinging while meditating on the saḷāyatana eradicates sense-pleasure clinging.
- Dependent Origination (Pali: paṭicca-samuppāda; Skt.: pratitya-samutpada):
  As indicated in Figure 2 above, the six saḷāyatana (Pali; Skt.: ṣaḍāyatana) are the fifth link in the Twelve Causes (nidāna) of the chain of Dependent Origination and thus likewise are the fifth position on the Wheel of Becoming (bhavacakra). The arising of the six saḷāyatana is dependent on the arising of material and mental objects (Pali, Skt.: nāmarūpa); and, the arising of the six saḷāyatana leads to the arising of "contact" (Pali: phassa; Skt.: sparśa) between the saḷāyatana and consciousness (Pali: viññāṇa; Skt.: visjñāna) which results in pleasant, unpleasant and neutral feelings (Pali, Skt.: vedanā).
- Elements (Pali, Skt.: dhātu):
  The eighteen elements include the twelve saḷāyatana. The eighteen elements are six triads of elements where each triad is composed of a sense object (the external saḷāyatana), a sense organ (the internal saḷāyatana) and the associated sense-organ-consciousness (viññāṇa). In other words, the eighteen elements are made up of the twelve saḷāyatana and the six related sense-consciousnesses.
- Karma (Skt.; Pali: kamma):
  In a Samyutta Nikaya discourse, the Buddha declares that the six internal senses bases (eye, ear, nose, tongue, body and mind) are "old kamma, to be seen as generated and fashioned by volition, as something to be felt." In this discourse, "new kamma" is described as "whatever action one does now by body, speech, or mind." In this way, the internal saḷāyatana provide a link between our volitional actions and subsequent perceptions.

== See also ==
- Heart Sutra—Mahayana text that shows the ayatanas in Mahayana discourse
- Indriya—"faculties", which include a group of "six sensory faculties" similar to the six saḷāyatana
- Prajna (wisdom)
- Satipatthana Sutta—includes a meditation using saḷāyatana as the meditative object
- Skandha—a similar Buddhist construct
- Twelve Nidanas—the chain of endless suffering of which the saḷāyatana are the fifth link

== Sources ==
Primary

- Aung, S.Z.; Rhys Davids, C.A.F. (1910). Compendium of Philosophy (Translation of the Abhidhamm'attha-sangaha. Chipstead: Pali Text Society.
- Bodhi, Bhikkhu (2000a). A Comprehensive Manual of Abhidhamma: The Abhidhammattha Sangaha of Ācariya Anuruddha. Seattle, WA: BPS Pariyatti Editions. ISBN 1-928706-02-9.
- Bodhi, Bhikkhu (trans.) (2000b). The Connected Discourses of the Buddha: A Translation of the Samyutta Nikaya. (Part IV is "The Book of the Six Sense Bases (Salayatanavagga)".) Boston: Wisdom Publications. ISBN 0-86171-331-1.
- Bodhi, Bhikkhu (2005a). In the Buddha's Words: An Anthology of Discourses from the Pali Canon. Boston: Wisdom Publications. ISBN 0-86171-491-1.
- Bodhi, Bhikkhu (18 Jan 2005b). MN 10: Satipatthana Sutta (continued) (MP3 audio file) [In this series of talks on the Majjhima Nikaya, this is Bodhi's ninth talk on the Satipatthana Sutta. In this talk, the discussion regarding the sense bases starts at time 45:36]. Available on-line at http://www.bodhimonastery.net/MP3/M0060_MN-010.mp3.
- Buddhaghosa, Bhadantācariya (trans. from Pāli by Bhikkhu Ñāṇamoli) (1999). The Path of Purification: Visuddhimagga. (Chapter XV is "The Bases and Elements (Ayatana-dhatu-niddesa)".) Seattle, WA: BPS Pariyatti Editions. ISBN 1-928706-00-2.
- Ñāṇamoli, Bhikkhu (trans.) & Bodhi, Bhikkhu (ed.) (2001). The Middle-Length Discourses of the Buddha: A Translation of the Majjhima Nikāya. Boston: Wisdom Publications. ISBN 0-86171-072-X.
- Rhys Davids, Caroline A.F. ([1900], 2003). Buddhist Manual of Psychological Ethics, of the Fourth Century B.C., Being a Translation, now made for the First Time, from the Original Pāli, of the First Book of the Abhidhamma-Piṭaka, entitled Dhamma-Saṅgaṇi (Compendium of States or Phenomena). Whitefish, MT: Kessinger Publishing. ISBN 0-7661-4702-9
- Pine, Red (2004). The Heart Sutra: The Womb of the Buddhas. Shoemaker & Hoard. ISBN 1-59376-009-4.
- Soma Thera (trans.) (1999). The Discourse on the Arousing of Mindfulness (MN 10). Available on-line at Satipatthana Sutta: The Discourse on the Arousing of Mindfulness.
- Soma Thera (2003). The Way of Mindfulness: English translation of the Satipaṭṭhāna Sutta Commentary. Kandy, Sri Lanka: Buddhist Publication Society. ISBN 955-24-0256-5.
- Thanissaro Bhikkhu (trans.) (1993). Adittapariyaya Sutta: The Fire Sermon (SN 35.28). Available on-line at Adittapariyaya Sutta: The Fire Sermon.
- Thanissaro Bhikkhu (trans.) (1997a). Kamma Sutta: Action (SN 35.145). Available on-line at Kamma Sutta: Action.
- Thanissaro Bhikkhu (trans.) (1997b). Kotthita Sutta: To Kotthita (SN 35.191). Available on-line at Kotthita Sutta: To Kotthita.
- Thanissaro Bhikkhu (trans.) (1997c). Suñña Sutta: Empty (SN 35.85). Available on-line at Suñña Sutta: Empty.
- Thanissaro Bhikkhu (trans.) (1998a). Chachakka Sutta: The Six Sextets (MN 148). Available on-line at Chachakka Sutta: The Six Sextets.
- Thanissaro Bhikkhu (trans.) (1998b). Loka Sutta: The World (SN 12.44). Available on-line at Loka Sutta: The World.
- Thanissaro Bhikkhu (trans.) (1998c). Maha-salayatanika Sutta: The Great Six Sense-media Discourse (MN 149). Available on-line at Maha-salayatanika Sutta: The Great Six Sense-media Discourse.
- Thanissaro Bhikkhu (trans.) (1998d). Yavakalapi Sutta: The Sheaf of Barley (SN 35.207). Available on-line at Yavakalapi Sutta: The Sheaf of Barley.
- Thanissaro Bhikkhu (trans.) (2001a). Pahanaya Sutta: To Be Abandoned (SN 35.24). Available on-line at Pahanaya Sutta: To Be Abandoned.
- Thanissaro Bhikkhu (trans.) (2001b). Sabba Sutta: The All (SN 35.23). Available on-line at Sabba Sutta: The All.
- Thanissaro Bhikkhu (trans.) (2004). Asivisa Sutta: Vipers (SN 35.197). Available on-line at Asivisa Sutta: Vipers.
- Upatissa, Arahant, N.R.M. Ehara (trans.), Soma Thera (trans.) and Kheminda Thera (trans.) (1995). The Path of Freedom (Vimuttimagga). Kandy, Sri Lanka: Buddhist Publication Society. ISBN 955-24-0054-6.
- Vipassana Research Institute (VRI) (trans.) (1996). Mahāsatipaṭṭhāna Sutta: The Great Discourse on Establishing Mindfulness (Pali-English edition). Seattle, WA: Vipassana Research Publications of America. ISBN 0-9649484-0-0.

Secondary

- Ellis, Gabriel (2020), Āyatana in Early Buddhism (draft)
- Ellis, Gabriel (2021). "Āyatana, the Buddha's forgotten teaching". Academia Letters Article 749. doi:10.20935/AL749.
- Hamilton, Sue (2001). Indian Philosophy: A Very Short Introduction. Oxford: Oxford University Press. ISBN 978-0-19-285374-5.
- Matthews, Bruce (1995). "Post-Classical Developments in the Concepts of Karma and Rebirth in Theravāda Buddhism," in Ronald W. Neufeldt (ed.), Karma and Rebirth: Post-Classical Developments. Delhi, Sri Satguru Publications. (Originally published by the State University of New York, 1986). ISBN 81-7030-430-X.
- Rhys Davids, T.W. & William Stede (eds.) (1921–5). The Pali Text Society's Pali–English Dictionary. Chipstead: Pali Text Society. A general on-line search engine for the PED is available at http://dsal.uchicago.edu/dictionaries/pali/.

Preceded by Nāmarūpa	Twelve Nidānas; Ṣaḍāyatana	Succeeded by Sparśa
