= Theravada Abhidhamma =

Systematization of the Theravāda school's understanding of the highest Buddhist teachings

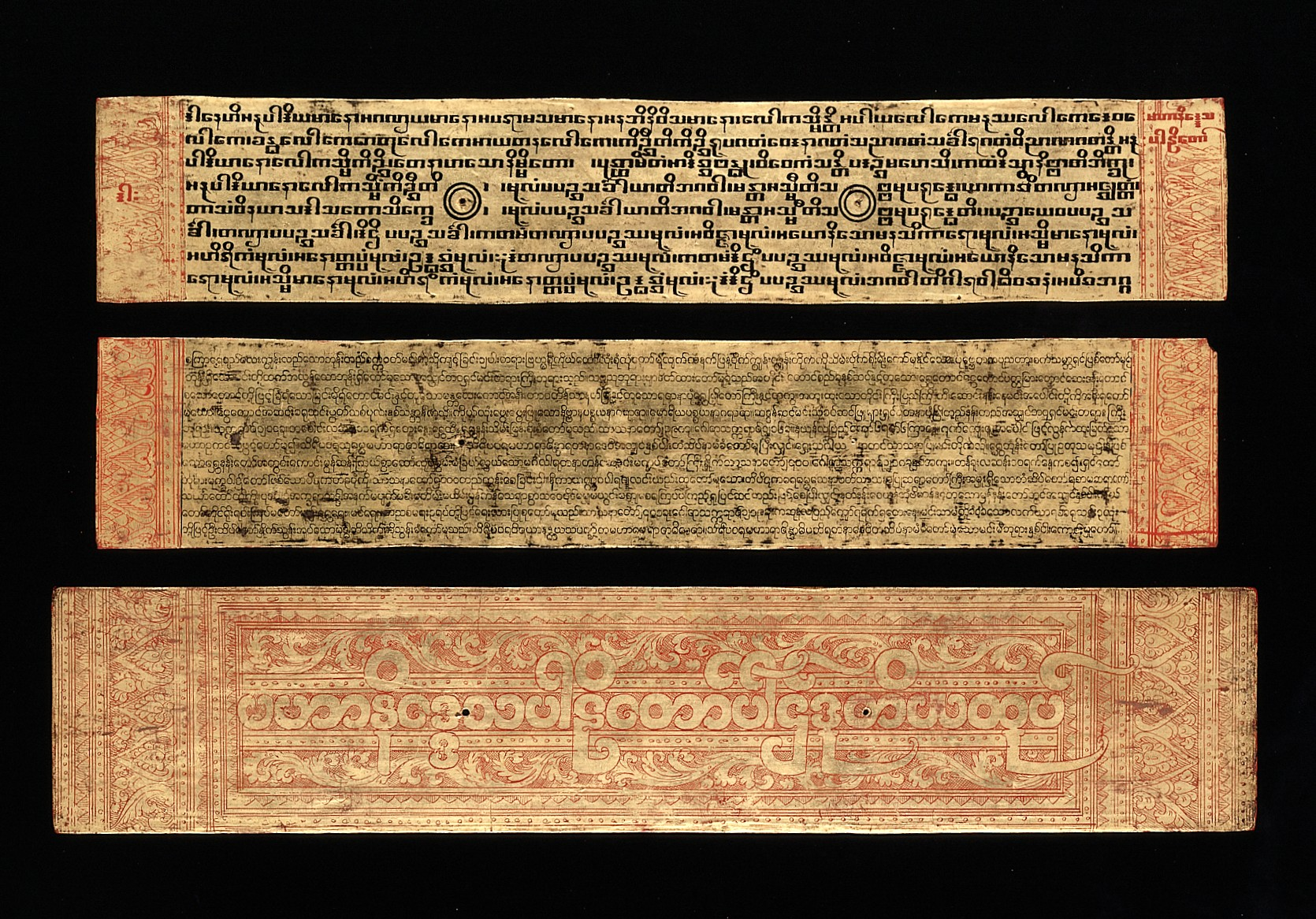
Three pages of a Burmese Pali manuscript of the Mahāniddesa, an Abhidhamma style commentary found in the Khuddaka Nikāya.

The Theravāda Abhidhamma tradition, also known as the Abhidhamma Method, refers to a scholastic systematization of the Theravāda school's understanding of the highest Buddhist teachings (Abhidhamma). These teachings are traditionally believed to have been taught by the Buddha, though modern scholars date the texts of the Abhidhamma Piṭaka to the 3rd century BCE. Theravāda traditionally sees itself as the vibhajjavāda ("the teaching of analysis"), which reflects the analytical (vibhajjati) method used by the Buddha and early Buddhists to investigate the nature of the person and other phenomena.

According to Bhikkhu Bodhi, a modern Theravāda scholar, the Abhidhamma is "simultaneously a philosophy, a psychology and an ethics, all integrated into the framework of a program for liberation."

=== Origin ===
According to traditional accounts preserved in the commentarial literature, the Buddha contemplated the Abhidhamma in the weeks following his enlightenment. The Atthasālinī (the commentary on the Dhammasaṅgaṇī) states that during the fourth week he sat in the Ratanaghara (“Jewel House”) and reviewed the seven books of the Abhidhamma in sequence. While he contemplated the contents of the first six books his body did not emit rays. But when he came to the Paṭṭhāna (called the “Great Book”) and began to contemplate its twenty-four universal causal relations,

his omniscience certainly found its opportunity therein. For as the great fish Timirati-piṅgala finds room only in the great ocean eighty-four thousand yojanas in depth, so his omniscience truly finds room only in the Great Book. Rays of six colours—indigo, golden, red, white, tawny, and dazzling—issued from the Teacher’s body, as he was contemplating the subtle and abstruse Dhamma by his omniscience which had found such opportunity.

There are different textual layers of Abhidhamma literature. The earliest Abhidhamma works are found in the Pali Canon. Then there are exegetical works which were composed in Sri Lanka in the 5th century. There are also later sub-commentarial works composed in later historical periods.

== Background and sources ==
The primary source for the Abhidhamma is the Abhidhamma Piṭaka, a set of seven texts which form the third "basket" of the Theravāda Tipiṭaka (also known as the Pāli Canon). It is generally accepted by modern scholars that these works began to be composed during the 3rd century BCE. They therefore cannot be the direct work of the Buddha himself, but of later disciples and scholars.

However, according to some scholars like Rupert Gethin, it is possible that some elements found in Abhidhamma, such as the mātikās (lists, matrices of doctrinal terms) are from an earlier date than the books themselves. This has been studied by Erich Frauwallner, who argues that there are kernels of early pre-sectarian material in the earliest Abhidhamma texts (such as in the Vibhanga, the Dharmaskandha, and the Śāriputrābhidharma). According to Frauwallner's comparative study, these texts were possibly developed and "constructed from the same material", mainly early mātikās (Sanskrit: mātṛkā) which forms the "ancient core" of early Abhidhamma.

The extensive use of mātikā can also be found in some suttas of the Sutta Pitaka, which have been seen as a "proto-abhidhamma" by scholars such as Johannes Bronkhorst and Frauwallner. These suttas include the Saṅgīti Sutta and Dasuttara Sutta, the two last suttas of the Dīgha Nikāya (as well as the Saṅgīti Sūtra and Daśottara Sūtra of the Dīrgha Āgama). Tse fu Kuan also argues that certain sutras of the Aṅguttara Nikāya (AN 3.25, AN 4.87–90, AN 9.42–51) depicts an early Abhidhamma type method.

The Khuddaka Nikāya includes a number of Abhidhamma type texts not found in the Abhidhamma Piṭaka. One of these is the Paṭisambhidāmagga. Others include the Niddessa, the Nettipakaraṇa and the Peṭakopadesa.

The Sri Lankan branch of the Theravāda school later developed further Abhidhamma texts, including commentaries (Aṭṭhakathā) on the books of the Abhidhamma and special introductory manuals. Major commentaries include the Atthasālinī (a commentary on the Dhammasaṅgaṇī), the Sammohavinodanī (a Vibhaṅga commentary) and the Pañcappakaṇaraṭṭhakathā, a commentary on the other books of the Abhidhamma Piṭaka. The Sri Lankan tradition also produced practice manuals, such as Vimuttimagga ("Path of Freedom") c. 1st or 2nd century CE.

The 5th century scholar Buddhaghosa is one of the most influential Abhidhammika of the Theravāda. His Visuddhimagga (a manual on spiritual praxis based on the Vimuttimagga) remains one of the most important Theravāda texts. Chapters XIV to XVII are a kind of summary of the Abhidhamma. His commentaries on the suttas also reflect an Abhidhamma perspective. A further period of medieval Sri Lankan scholarship also produced a series of texts called the sub-commentaries (which are commentaries to the commentaries).

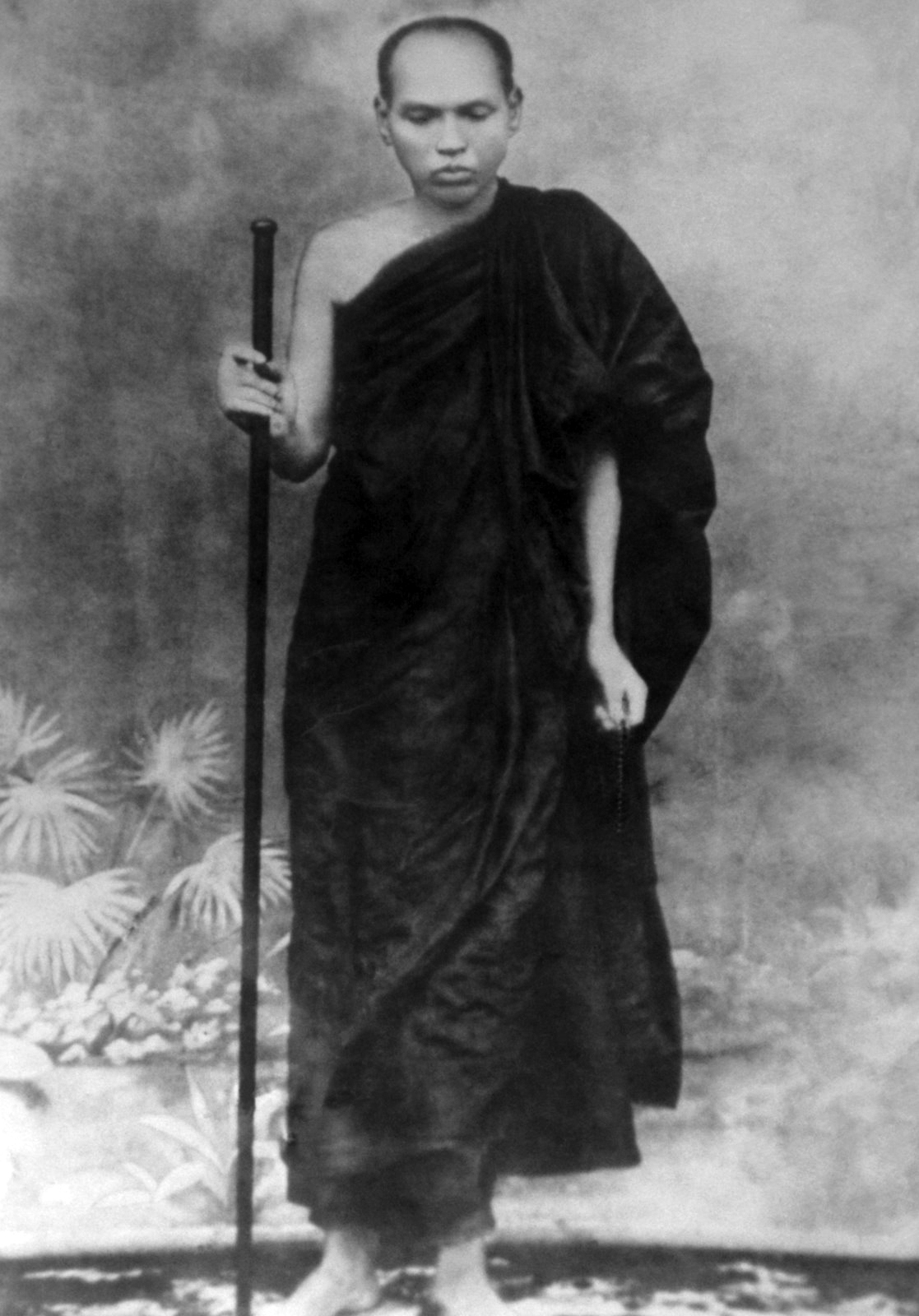
Ledi Sayadaw, one of the great Abhidhammikas of the 20th century.

There is also a genre of short introductory manuals to the Abhidhamma, like the 5th century Abhidhammāvatāra. The most influential of these manuals remains the short and succinct Abhidhammattha-saṅgaha of Ācariya Anuruddha. According to Bhikkhu Bodhi, this text has remained "the main primer for the study of Abhidhamma used throughout the Theravāda Buddhist world," and various commentaries have been written on it.

Abhidhamma remains a living tradition in Theravāda nations today and modern Abhidhamma works continue to be written in modern languages such as Burmese and Sinhala. Abhidhamma studies are particularly stressed in Myanmar, where it has been the primary subject of study since around the 17th century. One of the most important figures in modern Myanmar Buddhism, Ledi Sayadaw (1846–1923), was well known for his writings on Abhidhamma (especially his commentary on the Abhidhammatthasangaha, called the Paramatthadipanitika). This commentary, which critiqued an older 12th-century commentary from Sri Lanka (the Abhidhammattha-vibhavini-tika) led to a lively controversy, as different figures debated on Abhidhamma topics.

The books of the Abhidhamma Piṭaka were translated into English in the 20th century and published by the Pāli Text Society. The translators were C. A. F. Rhys Davids (Dhammasaṅgaṇī, Kathāvatthu), U Thittila (Vibhaṅga), U Narada (Dhātukathā, Paṭṭhāna), B.C. Law (Puggalapaññatti).

== Dhamma theory ==
In the Pāli Nikayas, the Buddha teaches through a method in which experience is explained using various conceptual groupings of physical and mental processes, which are called "dhammā". Examples of lists of dhammas taught by the Buddha in the Nikayas include the twelve sense 'spheres' (ayatana), the five aggregates (khandha) and the eighteen elements of cognition (dhatu).

Relationship between nāmarūpa, pañcakkhandha, and Abhidhamma
Groups			Pañcakkhandha (five aggregates)	Theravada Abhidhamma	
Groups			Pañcakkhandha (five aggregates)	Paramattha-sacca (ultimate reality)	
dhamma	saṅkhāra	nāma (mental)	viññāṇakkhandha (khandha of consciousness)	89/121 citta (consciousness)	81 mundane 8/40 supramundane
dhamma	saṅkhāra	nāma (mental)	vedanākkhandha (khandha of feeling)	52 cetasika (mental factors)	1 vedanācetasika (cetasika of feeling)
dhamma	saṅkhāra	nāma (mental)	saññākkhandha (khandha of perception)	52 cetasika (mental factors)	1 saññācetasika (cetasika of perception)
dhamma	saṅkhāra	nāma (mental)	saṅkhārakkhandha (khandha of formations)	52 cetasika (mental factors)	50 others
dhamma	saṅkhāra	rūpa (form)	rūpakkhandha (khandha of form)	28 rūpa (form)	4 primary elements 24 derived elements
dhamma	-			Nibbāna (Nirvana)	
Notes: The dhamma group consists of saṅkhāra and Nibbāna.; All saṅkhāra are anicca and dukkha.; All dhamma are anattā.; Distinguish between saṅkhāra and saṅkhārakkhandha.

The eighteen elements (aṭṭhārasa dhātuyo) from the internal-external sense bases (āyatana) that condition contact (phassa)
No.	Sense elements (indriya-dhātu)	No.	Object elements (ārammaṇa-dhātu)	No.	Consciousness elements (viññāṇa-dhātu)
1.	eye (cakkhudhātu)	7.	visual form (rūpadhātu)	13.	eye consciousness (cakkhuviññāṇadhātu)
2.	ear (sotadhātu)	8.	sound (saddadhātu)	14.	ear consciousness (sotaviññāṇadhātu)
3.	nose (ghānadhātu)	9	odor/smell (gandhadhātu)	15.	nose consciousness (ghānaviññāṇadhātu)
4.	tongue (jivhādhātu)	10.	taste (rasadhātu)	16.	tongue consciousness (jivhāviññāṇadhātu)
5.	body (kāyadhātu)	11.	touch (phoṭṭhabbadhātu)	17.	body consciousness (kāyaviññāṇadhātu)
6.	mind (manodhātu)	12.	mental object (dhammadhātu)	18.	mind consciousness (manoviññāṇadhātu)

Expanding these various models, the Pāli Abhidhamma concerned itself with providing a finer and more exhaustive understanding of all phenomenal experience by explaining, analyzing and classifying all dhammas and their relationships. According to Y. Karunadasa, for the Abhidhamma, dhammas are "the basic factors into which all things can be resolved" and "elementary constituents, the ultimate realities behind manifest phenomena." This "Dhamma theory" is the central theory or cornerstone of the Pāli Abhidhamma. According to various scholars of Abhidhamma, the main point of this theory is to provide a useful schema for meditative contemplation and insight into the nature of phenomena.

"Dhammā" has been translated as "factors" (Collett Cox), "psychic characteristics" (Bronkhorst), "psycho-physical events" (Noa Ronkin) and "phenomena" (Nyanaponika Thera). Noa Ronkin defines dhammas as "the constituents of sentient experience; the irreducible ‘building blocks’ that make up one's world, albeit they are not static mental contents and certainly not substances."

According to Karunadasa, a dhamma, which can be translated as "a 'principle' or 'element' (dhamma)", is "those items that result when the process of analysis is taken to its ultimate limits". However, this does not mean that they have an independent existence, for it is "only for the purposes of description" that they are postulated. They are also said to be not-self (anatta) and thus empty (suññā).

After all, dhammas are interconnected and interdependent in various relationships. Thus, the Pali Abhidhamma is not a type of pluralism, since it relies on both analysis (bheda) and synthesis (sangaha). According to Karunadasa, this "has enabled it to transcend the binary opposition between pluralism (sabbam puthuttam) and monism (sabbam ekattam), or as one Pāli commentary says, the binary opposition between the principle of plurality (nānatta-naya) and the principle of unity (ekatta-naya)." (Note: Karunadasa explains: "Analysis shows that what we take to be one is really many, what appears to be a unity is only a union of several factors. Its purpose is to dispense altogether with the notion of self or substance, the belief that there is an inner and immutable core in our objects of experience. However, analysis can achieve this objective only partially, for when it dispels the notion of substance from what is analysed all that it does is to transfer the notion of substance from one locus to another, from the whole to the parts, from the thing which is analysed to the factors into which it is analysed. The notion of the substantial forest vanishes, yielding place to a multiplicity of equally substantial trees. This inadequacy of the analytical method could be remedied when it is supplemented by synthesis (sangaha), i.e., the interrelating of the factors obtained through analysis. Synthesis shows that the factors into which a thing is analysed are not discrete entities existing in themselves but inter-connected and inter-dependent nodes in a complex web of relationships, so that none of them could be elevated to the level of a substance or discrete self-entity. Thus both analysis and synthesis combine to demonstrate that what is analysed and the factors into which it is analysed are equally non-substantial."(Karunadasa (2010) pp. 20–21.))

That the Pali Abhidhamma sought to avoid both absolute pluralism and monism can be seen in various commentarial statements that warn against a one-sided focus or grasping on the principle of plurality (nānattta-naya). For example, the sub-commentary to the Dīgha Nikāya says that "the erroneous grasping of the principle of plurality is due to the undue emphasis on the radical separateness (accanta-bheda) of the dhammas."

Likewise, dhammas "are not fractions of a whole indicating an absolute unity" or manifestations of a single metaphysical substratum, since this would be the opposite error, a one-sided focus on the principle of unity. Instead, they are simply a "multiplicity of inter-connected but distinguishable co-ordinate factors." This is said to correspond to the idea that the Buddha's teaching is an ontological middle way between various extremes, such as absolute existence and non-existence, or radical plurality and absolute monism.

While dhammas are said to be distinguishable (vibhāgavanta) from each other, they are said to arise together in clusters due to their inseparability (samsatthatā, avinibhogatā). This principle can also be seen in the suttas (see: Mahāvedalla Sutta,) which state that some dhammas are said to be blended (samsattha) in such a way that they cannot be separated out. The fact that dhammas always arise together is also connected to their conditional dependence on each other. In the Abhidhamma, nothing arises without a cause, from a single cause or as a single effect. Therefore, in Abhidhamma "it is always the case that a plurality of conditions gives rise to a plurality of effects. Applied to the dhamma theory this means that a multiplicity of dhammas brings about a multiplicity of other dhammas."

=== Their nature and characteristics ===
According to the Atthasalini: "Dhammas bear their own particular natures (sabhāva). Alternatively, dhammas are borne by conditions, or according to particular natures." The use of the term sabhāva (own nature, own being) in the description of dhammas is not found in the books of the Abhidhamma Pitaka, but does appear in other texts such as the Nettippakarana and in the commentaries. Theravāda commentaries sometimes equate the two terms, such as the Visuddhimagga which states that ‘dhamma means sabhāva ’.

However, it should be remembered that the Theravāda conception of sabhāva does not mean an essence or a substantial mode of being, since dhammas are not permanent, or totally discrete entities. They are always in dependently conditioned relationships with other dhammas and always changing. Therefore, it is only for the sake of description that they are said to have their "own nature" (sabhāva). According to Karunadasa, this usage of sabhāva is only of provisional validity, "an attribution made for the convenience of definition." It merely refers to the fact that "any dhamma represents a distinct fact of empirical existence which is not shared by other dhammas."

According to Peter Harvey, the Theravāda view of a dhamma's sabhāva is that it refers to an individualizing characteristic (salakkhaṇa) that "is not something inherent in a dhamma as a separate ultimate reality, but arise due to the supporting conditions both of other dhammas and previous occurrences of that dhamma". This is shown by other definitions given in the commentaries, which state that a dhamma is "that which is borne by its own conditions," and "the mere fact of occurrence due to appropriate conditions."

Similarly, Noa Ronkin argues that in Theravāda Abhidhamma, "sabhāva is predominantly used for the sake of determining the dhammas’ individuality, not their existential status". Sabhāva is therefore synonymous with salakkhaṇa (own characteristic), which is what differentiates one type of dhamma from another for the convenience of definition. Salakkhaṇa (own characteristic) is also called as "individual characteristic" (paccatta-lakkhaṇa), "special characteristic" (visesa-lakkhaṇa), "the characteristic which separates it from other characteristics" (asādhāraṇa-lakkhaṇa), and "intrinsic characteristic" (āveṇika-lakkhaṇa). For example, this mode of description is what allows us to say that the individual characteristic of the earth element is solidity. This is contrast to "universal characteristics" of all dhammas (sāmanna-lakkhaņa), which are those features all dhammas share.

Thus, while in Theravāda Abhidhamma, dhammas are the ultimate constituents of experience, they are not seen as substances (attena), essences or independent particulars, since they are empty (suñña) of a self (attā) and conditioned. This is spelled out in the Patisambhidhamagga, which states that dhammas are empty of sabhāva (sabhavena suññam).

According to Ronkin, the canonical Pāli Abhidhamma remains pragmatic and psychological, and "does not take much interest in ontology" in contrast with the Sarvastivada tradition. Paul Williams also notes that the Abhidhamma remains focused on the practicalities of insight meditation and leaves ontology "relatively unexplored". Ronkin does note however that later Theravāda sub-commentaries (ṭīkā) do show a doctrinal shift towards ontological realism from the earlier epistemic and practical concerns.

=== Classification of dhammas ===
The Theravāda Abhidhamma holds that there is a total of 82 possible types of dhammas, 81 of these are conditioned (sankhata), while one is unconditioned. These dhammas are divided into four main categories:

1. Citta (Mind, Consciousness, awareness)
2. Cetasika (mental factors, mental events, associated mentality), there are 52 types.
3. Rūpa (physical occurrences, material form), 28 types.
4. Nibbāna — (Extinction, cessation). The only unconditioned dhamma, it neither arises nor ceases due to causal interaction.

Since no dhamma exists independently, every single dhamma of consciousness, known as a citta, arises associated (sampayutta) with at least seven mental factors (cetasikas). In Abhidhamma, all awareness events are thus seen as being characterized by intentionality (aboutness, direction) and never exist in isolation.

=== The conceptual (paññatti) ===
From the Abhidhamma perspective, there are really only dhammas and their relations. If this is so, how can one explain common sense reality, the everyday world? To answer this, Ābhidhammikas resorted to the nominalist theory of paññatti (concepts, designations) as a way to explain such basic universal categories as unity, identity, time and space. The Buddha made use of this term in the suttas, as can be seen in the Potthapāda Sutta, where he explains that even though he uses the word "myself" (atta), he is not referring to an ultimate essence, only speaking conventionally and that such terms "are names (samaññā), expressions (nirutti), turns of speech (vohāra), and designations (paññatti) in common use in the world. And of these the Tathāgata makes use indeed, but is not led astray by them". Also, the Niruttipatha Sutta states that the division of time into past, present and future are "three pathways of expression (nirutti), designation (adhivacana), and concept-making (paññatti)."

The first definition of the term in an Abhidhamma text is that found in the Dhammasangani: "That which is an enumeration, that which is a designation, an expression (paññatti), a current term, a name, a denomination, the assigning of a name, an interpretation, a distinctive mark of discourse on this or that dhamma." The pali commentary adds that this means "the process of predicating", and that things such as "I", "mine", "another", "a person", "a monastery" and "a chair" are all predications. These conceptual designations depend on the mind and are not themselves the dhammas, the ultimate realities, that is to say, they are not the ultimate truth (paramattha). Together, the conceptual and the ultimate reality constitute the whole of the knowable (ñeyya-dhamma).

Paññattis are seen as without sabhāva (asabhāva), are "distinct from both mind and matter," do not arise and fall like dhammas do and "are not brought about by conditions", are “not positively produced” (aparinipphanna) and are neither conditioned (sankhata) nor unconditioned (asankhata). In Abhidhamma, paññattis are a "merely conceptualized" (parikappa-siddha) "product of the mind's synthesizing function", and "exists only by virtue of conceptual thought." There are two kinds of mutually interdependent conceptualizations:

- nāma-paññatti (conceptual name), "refers to names, words, signs, or symbols through which things, real or unreal, are designated." It is a mode of recognizing things which is "created by worldly consent (lokasahketa-nimmitā) and established by worldly usage (lokavohārena siddhā)."
- attha-paññatti (conceptual meaning), "refers to ideas, notions, or concepts corresponding to the names," it is "produced by the interpretative and synthesizing function of the mind (kappanā) and is based on the various forms or appearances presented by the real existents."

Names can be assigned to everything, including dhammas, however, unlike with everyday objects, names given to dhammas do not have a corresponding attha-paññatti, because dhammas are "profound." According to Karunadasa, "what this seems to mean is that objects of conceptual thought like tables and chairs are easily recognizable, whereas the dhammas are difficult to be grasped." It is only in deep meditation that one is said to transcend conceptuality and gain direct insight into the dhammas themselves, seeing them as empty (suñña) and impersonal (nissatta, nijjīva). It is not only everyday objects that are conceptual, but also persons (pudgala), time (kala), and the characteristics of dhammas when considered as separate abstractions, including universal characteristics (sāmanna-lakkhaņa) such as impermanence (aniccatā) as well as the principle of dependent origination and the four noble truths.

=== Two truths ===
According to Y. Karunadasa, for the Theravāda, the two truths theory which divides reality into sammuti (worldly conventions) and paramattha (ultimate, absolute truths) is a doctrinal innovation of the Abhidhamma, but it has its origins in some statements from the early Pāli Nikayas. This can mainly be seen in the distinction made in the Aṅguttara-nikāya between statements (not truths) that are nītattha (explicit, definitive) and neyyattha (requiring further explanation). Karunadasa notes that in the Nikayas, "no preferential value judgment is made between nītattha and neyyattha. All that is emphasized is that the two kinds of statement should not be confused."

Another early source of this doctrine is the Saṅgīti-sutta of the Dīgha-nikāya, which lists four kinds of knowledge: (a) the direct knowledge of the doctrine (dhamme ñāna), (b) the inductive knowledge of the doctrine (anvaye ñana), (c) knowledge of analysis (paricchede ñana), and knowledge of (linguistic) conventions (sammuti-ñana). In the earlier Nikayas, as opposed to the Abhidhamma, sammuti (linguistic conventions) is not analyzed down into existents called paramattha (ultimate).

In the Theravāda Abhidhamma, the distinction does arise, referring to:

two levels of reality, namely that which is amenable to analysis and that which defies further analysis. The first level is called sammuti because it represents conventional or relative truth or what is called consensual reality, and the second is called paramattha because it represents the absolute truth or ultimate reality.

Therefore, in Abhidhamma, when a situation is explained in terms of what cannot be empirically analyzed further into smaller components with different characteristics (lakkhana) that explanation is paramattha-sacca (ultimate truth), and when it is explained in terms of what is analyzable further due to being dependent on the mind's synthesizing function (i.e. paññatti), that explanation is sammuti-sacca (truth by convention), which exists in a relative or conventional sense due to mental conception (attha-paññatti) and linguistic construction (nama-paññatti).

However, even these ultimate components (i.e. dhammas) are dependently originated, "necessarily co-existent and positionally inseparable (padesato avinibhoga)". Unlike in the Sanskrit-based Buddhist tradition which refer to the conventional truth as samvrti (which has the meaning of concealing or covering), the Pāli Abhidhamma term sammuti just means human convention and does not have this connotation of an inferior truth hiding a higher truth.

Therefore, as pointed out by K.N. Jayatilleke, the Theravāda version of two truths "does not imply that what is true in the one sense is false in the other or even that the one kind of truth is superior to the other". As Karunadasa writes:

the distinction between sammuti-sacca and paramattha-sacca does not refer to two kinds of truth as such, but to two ways of presenting what is true. Although they are formally introduced as two truths, they are explained as two modes of expressing what is true. They do not represent two degrees of truth, of which one is superior or inferior to the other. Nor do they represent two parallel truths.

Because of this, in Abhidhamma, even paramattha-sacca is explained through concepts, though the ultimate itself is not a product of the mind's conceptual function (paññatti), it cannot be explained without the medium of paññatti.

Furthermore, according to Tse Fu Kuan, the Dhammasaṅgaṇi, "does not appear to uphold that dhammas are ultimate realities as against conventional constructs like persons." This text also states that “all dhammas are ways of designation (paññatti)”, that “all dhammas are ways of interpretation (nirutti)” and that “all dhammas are ways of expression (adhivacana)”. Therefore, the canonical Abhidhamma Pitaka does not uphold the interpretation of the two truths as referring to primary ontological realities.

Karunadasa notes how the Pali commentaries state that "the Buddha sometimes teaches the Dhamma according to conventional truth, sometimes according to ultimate truth, and sometimes through a combination of both." This is compared to a teacher using different dialects to teach his pupils. "There is absolutely no implication here that one dialect is either higher or lower than another."

=== Nibbāna, the unconditioned dhamma ===
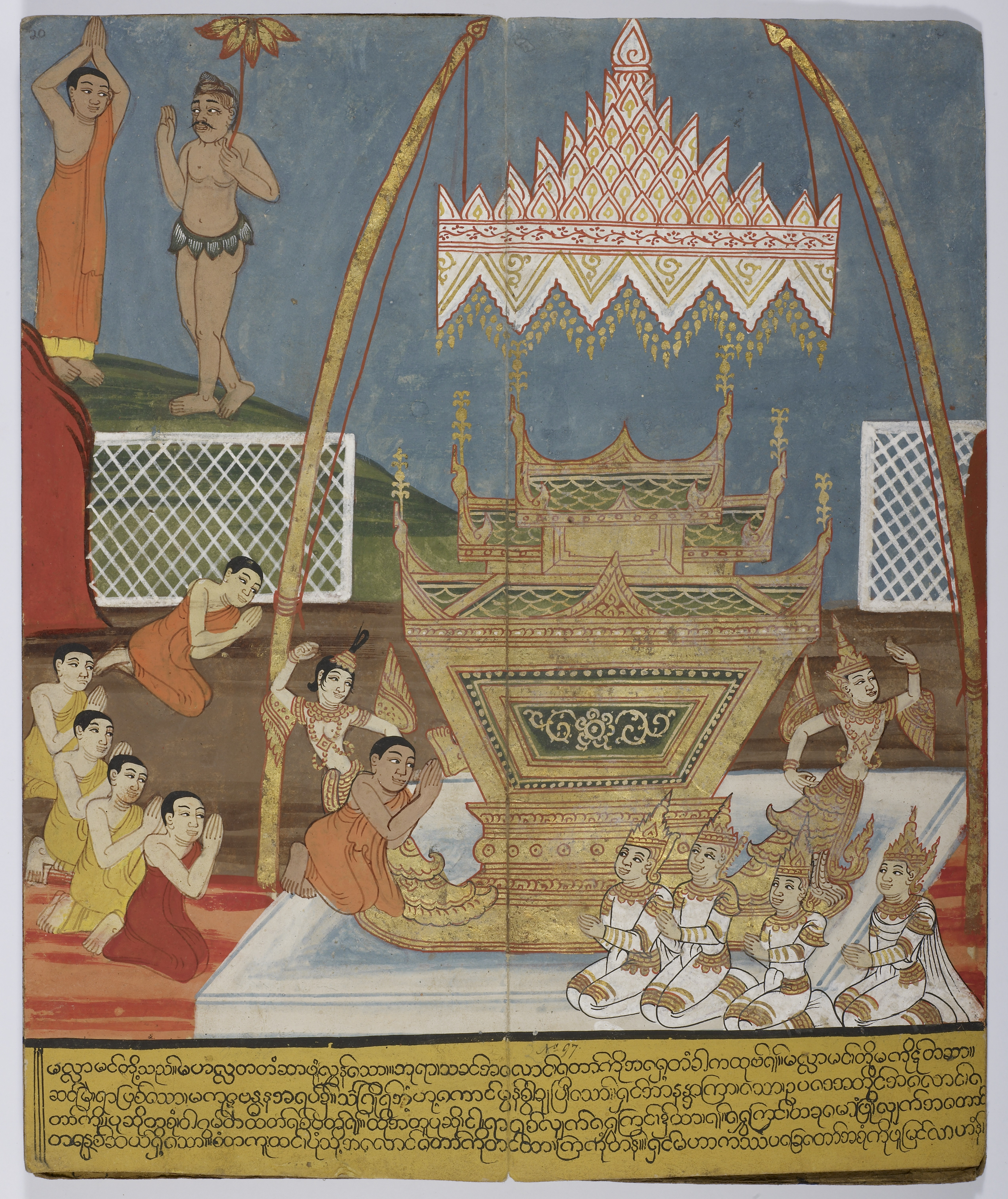
Mahākassapa pays homage to the Buddha's remains after the final nibbāna (at the death of the body), Burma, mid 19th century.

The suttas do not define the nature of nibbāna in a technical and philosophical sense, but focus on explaining it psychologically and through metaphor as the 'blowing out' of greed, hatred and delusion and remain ambiguous about its metaphysical status. The various Abhidharma systems attempted to provide a fuller ontological account of nibbāna.

The Theravāda position is first found in the Dhammasaṅgaṇī, which describes nibbāna as the unconditioned element (asankhata-dhatu), completely outside of the five aggregates. It is a dhamma which "is neither skilful nor unskilful, associated neither with feeling nor with cognition, neither resultant nor giving result, does not require any object, is not classified as past, present or future." Though it is not accessible by discursive or conceptual thought, it is a dhamma that can be cognized or attained by the mind.

The Theravāda commentarial literature also further developed their view of nibbāna, where it is seen as a real dhamma with a specific own nature or characteristic as well as being completely devoid of any conditioned characteristic. According to Buddhaghosa: "it is because it is uncreated (appabhava) that it is free from ageing and death. It is because of the absence of its creation and of its ageing and death that it is permanent. He argues against the view that nibbana is unreal or non-existent and quotes a famous verse found in the Itivuttaka and the Udana which states "There is an unborn, an unbecome, an unmade, an unconditioned..." Thus, the commentary to the Visuddhimagga states that nibbāna is the opposite to all conditioned states. In Theravāda Abhidhamma, nibbāna is seen as totally other than the conditioned existents and as the only unique unconditioned dhamma.

Therefore, Theravāda Abhidhamma holds that there is only one singular nibbāna, unlike in Vaibhasika or Mahayana Abhidharma, where there are different types of unconditioned elements and different forms of nibbāna (such as the apratistha or non-abiding nirvana of Mahayana and the unconditioned space element in Vaibhasika).

== Analysis of Mind ==
In Early Buddhism, consciousness is a phenomenon that always arises based on conditions (i.e. it is dependently originated) and it also never arises by itself, but is always found in relationship with the other four aggregates of personality. Likewise, it is also said to be mutually dependent on and arise together with "name and form" (nama-rupa). Name refers to feeling (vedanā), perception (saññā), volition (cetanā), sense-impression (phassa), and attention (manasikāra), while form refers to the four great properties (see section on "Rupa"). In this sense, early Buddhism and Theravāda Abhidhamma, avoids both idealism or materialism, as well as any kind of dualism that sees mind and body as totally separate. Instead, it posits that mind and body are mutually dependent phenomena.

The Five Aggregates (pañcakkhandha)
according to the Pali Canon.

form (rūpa)
4 elements (mahābhūta)
	↓
	contact (phassa)
↓	↑
consciousness (viññāna)

→
←

←

mental factors (cetasika)
feeling (vedanā)
perception (sañña)
formation (saṅkhāra)

- Form is derived from the Four Great Elements.
- Consciousness arises from other aggregates.
- Mental Factors arise from the Contact of
  Consciousness and other aggregates.
- The five aggregates are no-self.

Source: MN 109 (Thanissaro, 2001) | diagram details

Using this perspective as its basic schema, Abhidhamma analyzes the cognitive process into individual cognitive units which have two main components: consciousness events (cittas, an intentional knowing or awareness of an object) and mental factors (cetasikas, mentality that arises in association with cittas). These two components always arise together, and when the Abhidhamma speaks of a citta, it is understood that cetasikas are also present. This is like stating that a king has arrived, one assumes that he has arrived with his retinue as well. These two conjoined (samsattha) principles are said to be subtle and difficult to differentiate, like the different flavors in a soup. They arise yoked (sampayoga) together, have the same object and cease together.

An instance of cognition is therefore a constellation or a complex of various dhammas in various relationships and "they are neither derivable from one another nor reducible to a common ground." They also do not inhere in each other as qualities inhere in substances in other philosophical systems. Furthermore, each instance of cognition is also in various relationships with other instances of cognition. Since it is never an isolated event, it is conditioned by past instances and becomes a condition for future events. The various conditional relations are explained in detail in the Paṭṭhāna.

These cognitive events happen serially, one at a time. At any moment, there is only one of these cognitive acts. Also, according to Karunadasa, "what is more, the present cognitive act cannot cognize itself. It is just like the same sword cannot cut itself, or the same finger-tip cannot touch itself. This amounts to a rejection of what is called “taññānatā”, i.e., the idea that the same consciousness has knowledge of itself."

=== The cittas ===
Cittas are consciousness events, i.e. those events which constitute the "knowing" or awareness of an object. These never arise on their own, but are always intentional (i.e. have a cognitive object or direction). In the Abhidhamma exegesis, citta (synonymous with viññana) is defined in three main ways:

1. By way of agent (kattu-sādhana): “Consciousness is that which cognizes an object.”
2. By way of instrument (karaņa-sādhana): “Consciousness is that through which the concomitant mental factors cognize the object.”
3. By way of activity or mode of operation (bhāva-sādhana): “Consciousness is the mere act of cognizing the object.” This definition is the only one which "is said to be valid from an ultimate point of view" (nippariyayato), since, strictly speaking, consciousness is not a thing, but an activity or process.

The Abhidhamma provides numerous classifications and categories of consciousness. The most well known is that of the six "doors" which correspond to the five physical faculties, namely: the consciousnesses associated with the eye, ear, nose, tongue, and body, as well as mind-consciousness (mano-viññana). Each of the five cognitive faculties serve as a physical basis (vatthu, i.e. the eye organ, etc) for the consciousness that they support. The Theravāda Abhidhamma also holds that the mind consciousness also has a physical base, a view which is in disagreement with other Buddhist schools, but which finds support in the suttas, which state that consciousness and "name and form" (nama-rupa) are dependent on each other. The Paṭṭhāna does not give a specific organ or location for this basis, instead defining the base of the mind consciousness as "whatever materiality on which mental activity depends." Karunadasa believes that this is because early Abhidhamma considered the physical base of consciousness not to be limited to any one location in the body. Later Theravāda commentaries however do present a single location, which is called the heart-base (hadaya-vatthu), located inside the heart. Whatever the case, Abhidhamma does not consider the mind to be controlled or determined by the physical basis, which is only seen as a supporting element to the mind.

=== Types of citta ===
Though in one sense, consciousness (citta) has the single characteristic of knowing or awareness of an object, it can be classified into various types depending on the various ways it arises as combined with different mental factors (cetasikas). Cittas are thus classified into various groups based on different criteria, one of these is the Buddhist understanding of meditative states and how they correlate with Buddhist cosmology, another criterion is that of a citta's ethical (karmic) quality.

The first classification is separated into four classes of citta corresponding to the four planes of existence:

- The sense sphere (kāma-bhava), refers to cittas of the realm of the senses.
- The fine material sphere (rūpa-bhava), cittas experienced in the four rūpajjhāna (meditations in fine material realm) and in the rūpa-loka, a higher, more refined plane of existence. In these states, the five obstacles (nīvarana) are not present, and the corresponding factors of each of the four jhānas are present.
- The immaterial sphere (arūpa-bhava), cittas of the four arūpajjhānas and the formless realms.
- The supra-mundane (lokuttara), a consciousness that transcends the world of conditioned experience (i.e. the five aggregates) and "directly leads to the realization of Nibbāna."

These four classes of citta are not exclusive to their planes, they are merely the most commonly found in each plane. Therefore, for example, a person can exist in the sensual sphere, but through meditation, generate a consciousness of the immaterial sphere.

The second widely used classification, basing itself on kamma, divides consciousness into four classes:

- Skillful or wholesome (kusala). This refers to those pure and healthy cittas rooted in non-greed (alobha), non-hatred (adosa), and non-delusion (amoha). They are further divided into sub-classes depending on various factors such as the emotions that they are associated with (like joy or equanimity), whether they are associated with knowledge (ñāṇa-sampayutta) or not, and whether they are prompted (by some external influence or one's own deliberation) or unprompted (spontaenous or asankhārika, i.e. habitual).
- Unskillful or unwholesome (akusala), these are always in the sense sphere and are rooted in either greed, hatred or delusion (the three unwholesome roots). They are also further divided into sub-classes depending on various factors, such as the emotions that they are associated with (such as joy, displeasure, equanimity, etc).
- Resultant (vipāka), refers strictly to the results of kusala and akusala cittas and are thus neither kusala nor akusala. They are also said to be rootless because they are not rooted in the three unwholesome roots (or the three wholesome roots) since they are merely the results or fruits of karma.
- Functional (kiriya) cittas which do not generate karma (have no karmic potency) and are also neither kusala nor akusala. Some are rootless, and these are purely functional elements of the mind. Some are rooted in the three wholesome roots, these types are experienced only by those that have reached liberation.

Another classification is that of the “beautiful consciousness” (sobhana-citta), which "is an expression for all types of consciousness other than the twelve unwholesome and the eighteen rootless." They are called beautiful because they are always accompanied by beautiful mental factors (see below).

=== The cetasikas ===
The mental factors are those mental formations or fabrications (saṅkhāra) which arise conjoined with cittas. There are different classes of these mental events, the main ones are:

- Universals (sabbacittasādhāraṇa cetasikas), which are basic and rudimentary cognitive functions "common to all types of consciousness". They are phassa (contact), vedanā (feeling), saññā (perception), cetanā (volition), ekaggatā (one-pointedness), arūpa-jīvitindriya (psychic life-faculty), and manasikāra (attention).
- Occasionals (pakiṇṇaka cetasikas), "ethically variable “miscellaneous” mental factors found only in particular types of consciousness, not in all." These can be "wholesome or unwholesome depending on the kind of consciousness with which it is associated." They are: vitakka (application of thought), vicāra (examination), adhimokkha (decision), viriya (energy), pīti(rapture) and chanda (desire to act).
- Unwholesome (akusala cetasikas). They are accompanied by one or another of the three unwholesome roots. There are fourteen of them:
  - Moha - delusion
  - Ahirika - lack of shame
  - Anottappa - disregard for consequence
  - Uddhacca - restlessness
  - Lobha - greed
  - Diṭṭhi - wrong view
  - Māna - conceit
  - Dosa - hatred
  - Issā - envy
  - Macchariya - miserliness
  - Kukkucca - regret
  - Thīna - sloth
  - Middha - torpor
  - Vicikicchā - doubt
- Beautiful (sobhana cetasikas), accompanied by the wholesome roots.
  - Nineteen are universal beautiful factors (sobhanasādhāraṇa) which occur in all beautiful cittas:
    - Saddhā - faith
    - Sati - mindfulness
    - Hiri - shame at doing evil
    - Ottappa - regard for consequence
    - Alobha - lack of greed
    - Adosa - lack of hatred
    - Tatramajjhattatā - balance, neutrality of mind
    - Kāyapassaddhi - tranquility of mental body
    - Cittapassaddhi - tranquility of consciousness
    - Kāyalahutā - lightness of mental body
    - Cittalahutā - lightness of consciousness
    - Kāyamudutā - malleability/softness of mental body
    - Cittamudutā - malleability/softness of consciousness
    - Kāyakammaññatā - wieldiness of mental body
    - Cittakammaññatā - wieldiness of consciousness
    - Kāyapāguññatā - proficiency of mental body
    - Cittapāguññatā - proficiency of consciousness
    - Kāyujukatā - straightness/rectitude of mental body
    - Cittujukatā - straightness/rectitude of consciousness
  - The others are those which do not necessarily arise with every beautiful consciousness:
    - Sammāvācā - right speech
    - Sammākammanta - right action
    - Sammā-ājīva - right livelihood
    - Karuṇā - compassion
    - Mudita - sympathetic joy
    - Paññā - wisdom

=== The Cognitive Process ===
The Abhidhamma sees cognition as a continuum of momentary mental events without any enduring substance or self behind the process. This process begins with sensory contact and each momentary event in the mental stream (santāna) is conditioned (paccaya) by the immediately preceding one. These momentary events and their relationships are themselves the mind (citta).

The Abhidhamma cognitive process relies on the theory of the bhavanga ("ground of becoming", "condition for existence"), an innovation of the Theravāda Abhidhamma. It is a passive, process-free mode of consciousness. According to Rupert Gethin, it is "the state in which the mind is said to rest when no active consciousness process is occurring", such as that which prevails during deep, dreamless sleep. It is also said to be a process conditioning future rebirth consciousness. It is not an uncaused nor it is an objectless consciousness however, neither is it a substratum, since it must be interrupted for the process of cognition to begin. It is merely what the mind is doing when there it is not engaged in the active mental process of cognition. The six types of cognitive processes (citta-vithi) begin when one of the sense faculties (five senses and the sixth faculty, the mind) is activated by an object (which could be of varying levels of intensity).

The basic elements of a full cognitive process (which is said to take 17 "mind moments") with an intense object of one of the five senses is outlined as follows:

- One moment of passive past bhavanga
- The bhavanga begins to vibrate due to the impact of the object on the sense door.
- The bhavanga is interrupted in one moment.
- The "five-door adverting consciousness" arises, attention moves towards the sense door
- A sense consciousness arises, which is mere awareness of the sense object.
- According to Karunadasa, the next step are "three types of consciousness (citta) performing the functions of receiving (sampaticchana), investigating (santīrana), and determining (votthapana) the object." Each one takes one mind moment.
- Next comes the "javana" (literally: "running swiftly") stage. This is when the mind "'runs swiftly' over the object in the act of apprehending it." This process has cognitive, volitional and affective elements. It is the only part of the cognitive process that can include an act of will (cetana). Unlike the previous events which lasted for just one mind moment, this one is said to last 7 mind moments.
- The final stage is one called "having the object" or registration, it is a process which takes that which has been previously apprehended as its intentional object. This takes two mind moments.

Regarding their theory of sense perception and the nature of the cognitive object, the Theravāda Abhidhamma view is a kind of direct realism that says we do perceive external physical objects. According to Karunadasa, the Abhidhamma view is that "the object of sensory consciousness is not a mere collection of atoms, but a conglomeration of atoms assembled together in a certain manner."

Regarding mind sense cognitive processes, it is similar to the above, but purely mental. It happens when an idea or mental image comes into the range of the mind sense. Ideas can be generated either due to a physical object or "naturally", i.e. directly generated by the mind.

== Rūpa (matter) ==
The Abhidhamma Piṭaka there is no formal definition of matter of form (rūpa) itself, instead one finds individual definitions for material dhammas which make up material existence. In the commentaries, rūpa is defined as that which is mutable or alterable (vikara), in the sense of being able to be “deformed, disturbed, knocked about, oppressed, and broken”. According to Karunadasa, this is traceable to a sutta passage where the Buddha says: “And why, monks, do you say material form (rūpa)? It is deformed (ruppati), therefore it is called material form. Deformed by what? Deformed by cold, by heat, by hunger, by thirst, by flies, mosquitoes, wind, sunburn, and creeping things”.

Orthodox Theravāda's position on the nature of the physical (rūpa) is that it is one of the two main dependently originated processes of a person (as part of the mind-body complex called nama-rūpa). However, there is no dualism between these two, they are merely clusters of interacting processes, each depending on the other. As noted by Buddhaghosa (Vism. 596), each can only occur "supported by" (nissaya) the other, they are like a blind man that carries a crippled man, or two sheaves of reeds which lean on each other and support each other.

In Theravāda Abhidhamma, all matter is resolved into material dhammas. Rūpa dhammas are all based on the combination and interaction of the four mahabhuta, the four 'primary' or 'elementary' physical phenomena:

- Earth (prthivi): represents the characteristic of solidity, hardness, heaviness and extension.
- Water (ap): represents the characteristic of liquidity, fluidity, oozing, trickling, binding and cohesiveness.
- Fire (tejo) represents heat and warmth, when there is the absence of heat, there is "cold".
- Air (vayu) refers to distention and fluctuation, restless and dynamic movement.

In the Abhidhamma, the characteristic of the element and the element itself are the same thing, thus hardness is the same as the earth element, which is just a designation for the characteristic of hardness, extension, heaviness, etc. The earth element is also the same as softness or lightness, which is just the lack of hardness or heaviness.

In the Pāli Abhidhamma, the four primaries began to refer to the irreducible factors or data that make up the physical world. These basic phenomena come together to make up secondary physical phenomena, such as the sense organs. Thus, according to Y Karunadasa, Pāli Buddhism does not deny the existence of the external world and thus is a kind of realism. However, Theravāda also follows the view that rūpa, like all skandhas, is void (suñña), empty (ritta) and essence-less (asara).

Rūpa dhammas are not atomic ontological substances and are merely outlined as pragmatic descriptions of the world of experience. According to Karunadasa, this steers a middle course between the view that "all is an absolute unity" (sabbam ekattam) and that it is absolute separateness (sabbam puthuttam).

While material dhammas are often spoken about as distinct individual entities, this is only for the purpose of conventional description, since they always exist in a state of association and relationship with other material dhammas. They always arise together, and are always dependent on each other. All instances of matter thus includes all four primary elements, just in different intensities (ussada) or capabilities (samatthiya).

The smallest unit of matter, called a kalapa (literally ‘package’), is a collection or cluster of material dhammas. The term kalapa only became standard in the sub-commentarial literature and it is not a singular particle, but a collection of rupa-dhammas which are inseparable from each other and always occur simultaneously (sahajata).

The Abhidhamma lists 27 material dhammas, besides the four primary dhammas, there are various other derived or secondary dhammas (upādā-rūpa) that are conditioned and supported by the primary material dhammas. These include the five sense organs, the sense elements (like sound, smell, etc), the space element, the material faculty of vitality (rūpa-jīvitindriya) and the four phases of matter: production, continuity, decay and impermanence of matter (aniccatā). Most of these (such as the four phases and space) are actually only knowable by the mind faculty (manāyatana), through a process of inference. The main difference between the four primary dhammas and the derived dhammas is that the primaries only arise in dependence on each other, while derived matter arises in dependence on the four primaries.

== Space and Time ==
According to Karunadasa:

"On the subject of time the Abhidhamma Pitaka is relatively silent, perhaps because here time is not assigned the status of a dhamma. If time is not a dhamma, conditioned or unconditioned, this obviously means that it is a mental construct with no objective reality."

Thus, in the Theravāda Abhidhamma, time is mainly a conceptual construct, specifically it is a concept-as-name (nāma-paññatti) and does not exist in a real sense since it is a notion based on the continuous flow of phenomena. Time is just a conceptual construction, a mental interpretation, based on the production, change and dissolution of dhammas. Time has no own-nature (sabhāvato avijjamāna), unlike dhammas.

The same is also true of space (ākasa) which is described as a nominal (anipphanna) existent, which strictly speaking it is not material, nor an actual dhamma, but is simply the absence of matter. In this, they disagree with the Sarvāstivāda-Vaibhāṣika school which held that space is an unconditioned dhamma.

On the philosophy of time, the Theravāda tradition holds to philosophical presentism, the view that only present moment dhammas exist, against the eternalist view of the Sarvāstivādin tradition which held that dhammas exist in all three times – past, present, future.

=== Theory of moments ===
The early Theravādins who compiled the Kathāvatthu rejected the doctrine of momentariness (Skt: kṣāṇavāda, Pāli: khaṇavāda) upheld by other Buddhist Abhidharma schools like the Sarvāstivāda. This theory held that all dhammas lasted for a "moment", which for them meant an atomistic unit of time, that is the shortest possible time interval. The idea that the temporal extension of all dhammas lasts only for a minuscule "moment" is also not found in the suttas.

According to Noa Ronkin, early Theravādins (in the Abhidhamma Pitaka) did use the term "moment" (khaṇa) as a simple expression for a "short while", "the dimension of which is not fixed but may be determined by the context". In the Khanikakatha of the Kathavatthu, the Theravādins argue that "only mental phenomena are momentary, whereas material phenomena endure for a stretch of time". This was against the view of other schools like the Sarvāstivāda, which held that both material and mental dhammas are equally momentary. The Kathavatthu also argues against the idea that a mental state could last for a long period of time (and thus, not be momentary). This view was defended by some Buddhist schools, like the Andhakas, which apparently held that a single unit of consciousness could last for as long as a day (referring particularly to a deep state of meditation). Thus, the idea of a "moment" does appear in the Abhidhamma Pitaka, but not widely.

Out of these early ideas, the later commentarial Theravāda developed a more technical formal theory of moments, which held that each consciousness has three moments, the moment of origination (uppādakkhaņa), the moment of duration (thitikkhaņa), and the moment of dissolution (bhahgakkhaņa). These moments correspond with the three characteristics of the conditioned: jati (birth), decay (jarata) and bheda (dissolution).

The commentaries explain the changing nature of a dhamma by stating that they have definite temporal boundaries (its origination and cessation). Therefore, a dhamma is a momentary phenomenon that arises, exists for one moment, and totally disappears in the next. According to Karunadasa, "the sub-commentary to the Visuddhimagga defines viparināma (change) as sabhāva-vigamana, that is, as the disappearance of own-nature."

As has been noted above, in Theravāda, material dhammas last longer than mental ones. Karunadasa explains:

Thus, in introducing the doctrine of momentariness the Visuddhimagga says that the cessation of matter is slow (dandha-nirodha) and its transformation is ponderous (garu-parivatta), while the cessation of mind is swift (lahuparivatta) and its transformation is quick (khippa-nirodha). Accordingly the duration of matter in relation to mind is calculated to show that during one moment of matter seventeen mind-moments arise and cease. The moments of arising and ceasing are temporally equal for both mental and material dhammas. But in the case of material dhammas the moment of presence is longer.

== Conditional relations ==
Aside from the analysis of dhammas, the other main element of the Theravāda Abhidhamma is the study of how dhammas come together in a synthesis (sangaha) to form an interdependent web of relationships. This is presented in a theory of the various conditional relations that exist between the various dhammas which is presented in the last (seventh) book of the Abhidhamma Piṭaka, the Paṭṭhāna. The main goal of this theory of conditionality remains the explanation of the samsaric process of how suffering arises. According to Theravāda Buddhism, no temporal beginning is discernable and thus, the Abhidhamma doctrine of conditionality "dissociates itself from all cosmological causal theories which seek to trace the absolute origin of the world-process from some kind of uncaused trans-empirical reality."

Theravāda Abhidhamma considers three key axioms of conditionality:

- Everything arises due to causes and conditions, nothing arises without a cause.
- Nothing arises from a single cause (this rules out monism or monotheism).
- No phenomenon arises by itself as a single or solitary thing.

According to Karunadasa, this leads to the core Abhidhamma understanding of causality, which can be summarized as follows: "from a plurality of causes a plurality of effects takes place...a multiplicity of dhammas brings about a multiplicity of other dhammas." Thus, dhammas always arise in clusters, for example, every instance of consciousness always arises together with at least seven mental factors: contact (phassa), feeling (vedanā), perception (sannā), volition (cetanā), one-pointedness (ekaggatā), psychic life (arupa-jivitindriya), and attention (manasikāra). Likewise, every basic unit of matter is a cluster of eight material factors.

Another important principle in the Theravāda Abhidhamma is that dhammas do not exist or arise through their own power, they are devoid of own-power or own-sway. This is a rejection of the principle of self-causation Likewise, no dhamma can be brought into being by a power external to the dhammas either. These two rejections means that dhammas arise only by the help of other dhammas.

The Theravāda Abhidhamma teaches that there are twenty four kinds of conditional relation. There are three main factors involved in any relationship between dhammas: that dhamma which is doing the conditioning (paccaya-dhamma), that which is being conditioned (paccayuppanna-dhamma) and the conditioning force (paccaya-satti), which is really not different from the dhamma doing the conditioning (however, a dhamma can have more than one conditioning force). A conditioned is defined as "a dhamma which is helpful (upakāraka) for the origination (uppatti) or existence (thiti) of another dhamma related to it. This means that when a particular dhamma is activating as a condition, it will cause other dhammas connected to it, to arise, or if they have already arisen, it will maintain them in existence." Notably, there are no conditions for the cessation of a dhamma, only for their origination and maintenance.

== Spiritual practice and progress ==
The most influential presentation of the Theravāda Abhidhamma path to liberation is found in the Visuddhimagga ('Path of Purification') of Buddhaghoṣa.

The Visuddhimagga's doctrine includes several interpretations not found in the earliest discourses (suttas). The text uses meditation on kasina (colored disks) as the key practice from which it models the entrance into jhana. Kasina a kind of focusing meditation which is not widely found in the earlier suttas. The Visuddhimagga also describes the four jhanas and the four immaterial states in detail. It also describes forty meditation subjects (kammaṭṭhāna) and advises that one should ask a knowledgeable person to figure out which meditation suits one's temperament.

The Visuddhimagga analyzes the practice of the Buddhist path as divided into three main aspects: Sīla (ethics or discipline); 2) Samādhi (concentration achieved through meditation); 3) Pañña (spiritual understanding, wisdom). It also gives a more extended overview of the path to liberation, which is divided into seven major stages which are called the "Seven Stages of Purification" (satta-visuddhi). These stages are based on the Rathavinita Sutta ("Relay Chariots Discourse," MN 24).

The section on wisdom also provides an indepth overview of the process of vipassanā ("insight", "clear-seeing") meditation, and its progressive stages or "progress of insight" (visuddhiñana-katha). This progress is explained through a total of sixteen stages of insight or knowledge, called the vipassanā-ñāṇas.

== Sources ==
- Bodhi, Bhikkhu (2000). A Comprehensive Manual of Abhidhamma. Buddhist Publication Society. Buddhist Publication Society Pariyatti. ISBN 1-928706-02-9.
- Karunadasa, Y (2010). The Theravada Abhidhamma. Its Inquiry into the Nature of Conditioned Reality. Centre of Buddhist Studies, The University of Hong Kong. ISBN 978-988-99296-6-4.
- Nyanamoli, Bhikkhu (2011), The Path of Purification, Visuddhimagga, Kandy: Buddhist Publication Society, ISBN 955-24-0023-6.
- Nyanaponika Thera (1976). Abhidhamma studies (Third Edition).
- Potter, Buswell, Jaini; Encyclopedia of Indian Philosophies Volume VII Abhidharma Buddhism to 150 AD.
- Ronkin, Noa (2005). Early Buddhist Metaphysics: The Making of a Philosophical Tradition. Routledge
