= Blind men and an elephant =

Parable illustrating ontological reasoning

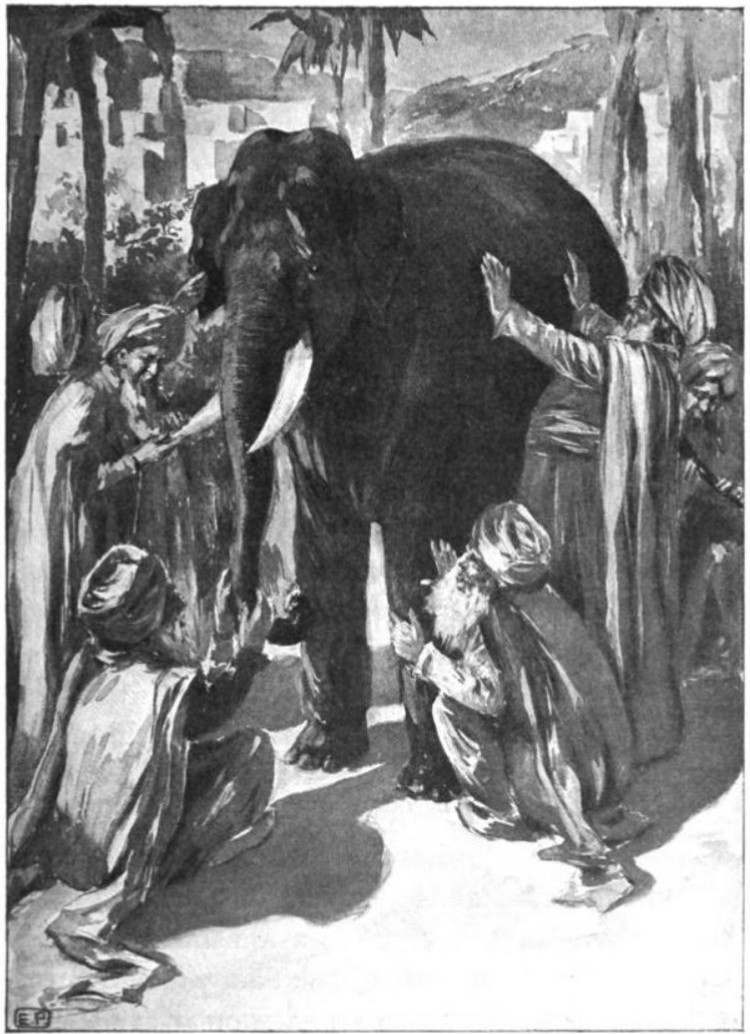
Blind men and the elephant, 1907 American illustration

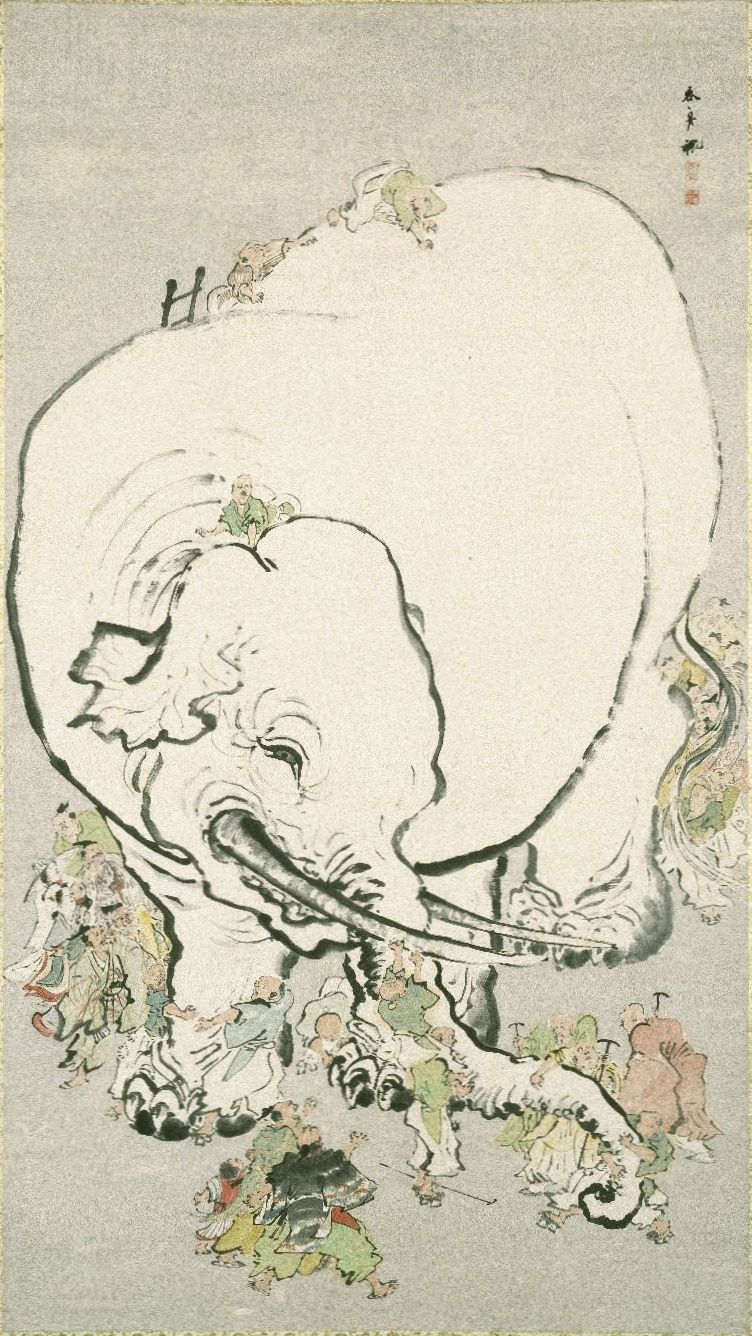
Blind Men Appraising an Elephant by Ohara Donshu, Edo Period (early 19th century), Brooklyn Museum

The parable of the blind men and an elephant is a story of a group of blind men who have never come across an elephant before and who learn and imagine what the elephant is like by touching it. Each blind man feels a different part of the animal's body, but only one part, such as the side or the tusk. They then describe the animal based on their limited experience and their descriptions of the elephant are different from each other. In some versions, they come to suspect that the other person is dishonest and they come to blows. Only in a handful of versions do the men find out the truth. Regardless, the moral of the parable is that humans have a tendency to claim absolute truth based on their limited, subjective experience as they ignore other people's limited, subjective experiences which may be equally true. The parable originated in the ancient Indian subcontinent, from where it has been widely disseminated.

This parable is found in the most ancient Jain agams before 5th century BCE.

The Buddhist text Tittha Sutta, Udāna 6.4, Khuddaka Nikaya, contains one of the versions of the story. The Tittha Sutta is dated to around c. 500 BCE, during the lifetime of the Buddha. Other versions of the parable describe sighted men encountering a large statue on a dark night, or some other large object while blindfolded.

In its various versions, it is a parable that has crossed between many religious traditions and is part of Jain, Hindu and Buddhist texts of 1st millennium CE or before. The story also appears in 2nd millennium Sufi and Baháʼí Faith lore. The tale later became well known in Europe, with 19th-century American poet John Godfrey Saxe creating his own version as a poem, with a final verse that explains that the elephant is a metaphor for God, and the various blind men represent religions that disagree on something no one has fully experienced. The story has been published in many books for adults and children, and interpreted in a variety of ways.

== The parable ==
The earliest versions of the parable of blind men and the elephant are found in Buddhist, Hindu and Jain texts, as they discuss the limits of perception and the importance of complete context. The parable has several Indian variations, but broadly goes as follows:

A group of blind men heard that a strange animal, called an elephant, had been brought to the town, but none of them were aware of its shape and form. Out of curiosity, they said: "We must inspect and know it by touch, of which we are capable". So, they sought it out, and when they found it they groped about it. The first person, whose hand landed on the trunk, said, "This being is like a thick snake". For another one whose hand reached its ear, it seemed like a kind of fan. As for another person, whose hand was upon its leg, said, the elephant is a pillar like a tree-trunk. The blind man who placed his hand upon its side said the elephant, "is a wall". Another who felt its tail, described it as a rope. The last felt its tusk, stating the elephant is that which is hard, smooth and like a spear.

In some versions, the blind men then discover their disagreements, suspect the others to be not telling the truth and come to blows. The stories also differ primarily in how the elephant's body parts are described, how violent the conflict becomes and how (or if) the conflict among the men and their perspectives is resolved. In some versions, they stop talking, start listening and collaborate to "see" the full elephant. In another, a sighted man enters the parable and describes the entire elephant from various perspectives, the blind men then learn that they were all partially correct and partially wrong. While one's subjective experience is true, it may not be the totality of truth.

The parable has been used to illustrate a range of truths and fallacies; broadly, the parable implies that one's subjective experience can be true, but that such experience is inherently limited by its failure to account for other truths or a totality of truth. At various times the parable has provided insight into the relativism, opaqueness or inexpressible nature of truth, the behavior of experts in fields of contradicting theories, the need for deeper understanding, and respect for different perspectives on the same object of observation. In this respect, it provides an easily understood and practical example that illustrates ontologic reasoning.

== References in religion ==
=== Hinduism ===
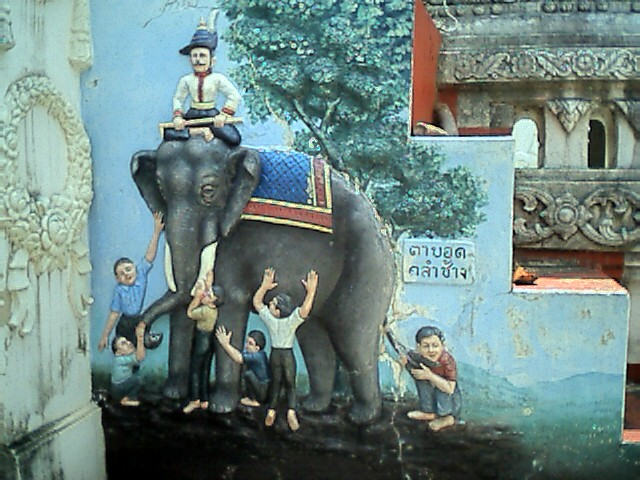
The blind men and the elephant (wall relief in Northeast Thailand)

The Rigveda, dated to have been written down (from earlier oral traditions) between 1500 and 1200 BCE, states "Reality is one, though wise men speak of it variously." According to Paul J. Griffiths, this premise is the foundation of universalist perspective behind the parable of the blind men and an elephant. The hymn asserts that the same reality is subject to interpretations and described in various ways by the wise. In the oldest version, four blind men walk into a forest where they meet an elephant. In this version, they do not fight with each other, but conclude that they each must have perceived a different beast although they experienced the same elephant. The expanded version of the parable occurs in various ancient and Hindu texts. Many scholars refer to it as a Hindu parable.

The parable or references appear in bhasya (commentaries, secondary literature) in the Hindu traditions. For example, Adi Shankara mentions it in his bhasya on verse 5.18.1 of the Chandogya Upanishad as follows:

etaddhasti darshana iva jatyandhah

Translation: That is like people blind by birth in/when viewing an elephant.

— Adi Shankara, Translator: Hans Henrich Hock

=== Jainism ===
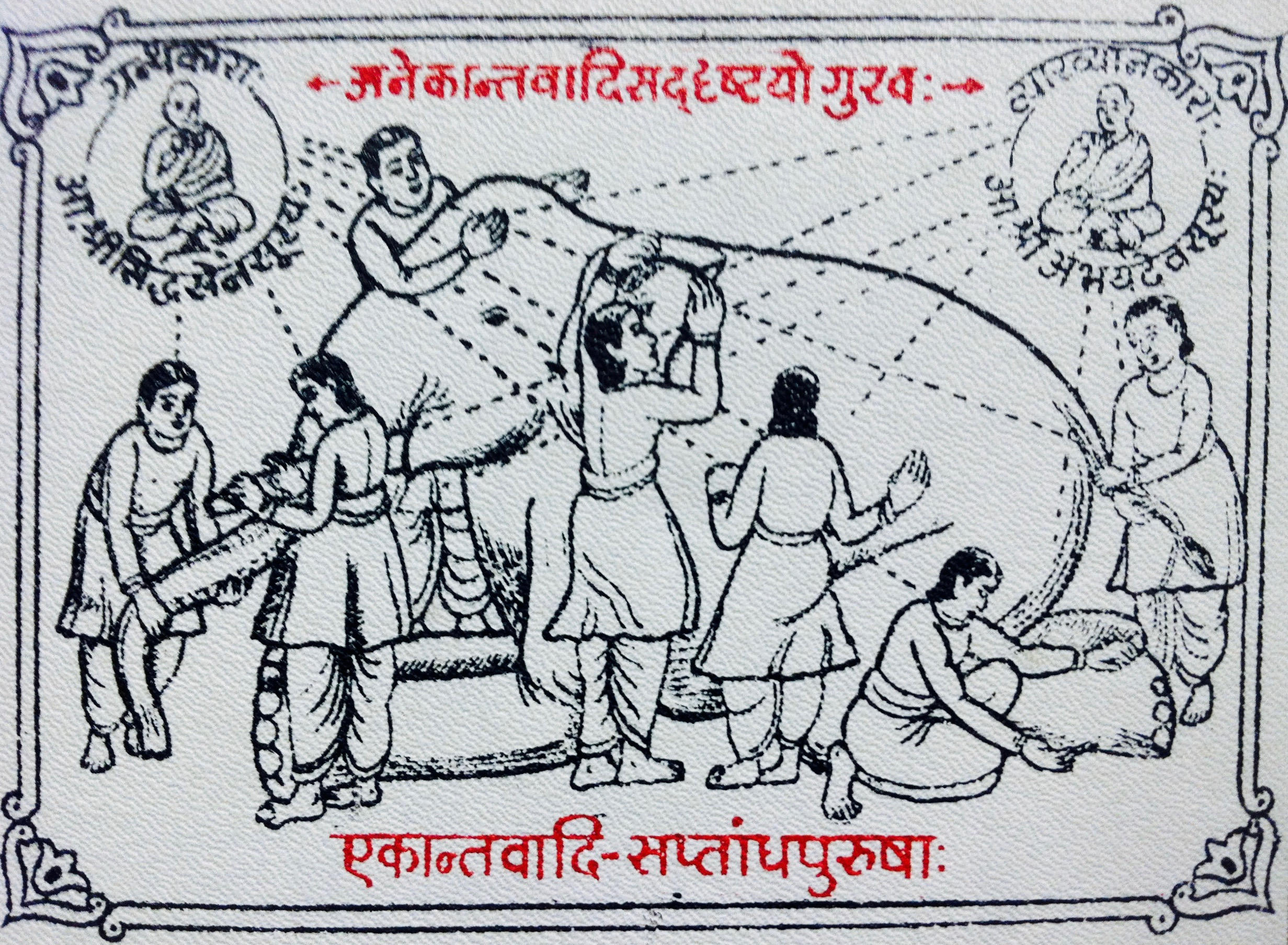
Seven blind men and an elephant parable at a Jain temple

The medieval era Jain texts explain the concepts of anekāntavāda (or "many-sidedness") and syādvāda ("conditioned viewpoints") with the parable of the blind men and an elephant (Andhgajanyāyah), which addresses the manifold nature of truth. This parable is found in the most ancient Jain agams before 5th century BCE. Its popularity remained till late. For example, this parable is found in Tattvarthaslokavatika of Vidyanandi (9th century) and Syādvādamanjari of Ācārya Mallisena (13th century). Mallisena uses the parable to argue that immature people deny various aspects of truth; deluded by the aspects they do understand, they deny the aspects they don't understand. "Due to extreme delusion produced on account of a partial viewpoint, the immature deny one aspect and try to establish another. This is the maxim of the blind (men) and the elephant." Mallisena also cites the parable when noting the importance of considering all viewpoints in obtaining a full picture of reality. "It is impossible to properly understand an entity consisting of infinite properties without the method of modal description consisting of all viewpoints, since it will otherwise lead to a situation of seizing mere sprouts (i.e., a superficial, inadequate cognition), on the maxim of the blind (men) and the elephant."

=== Buddhism ===
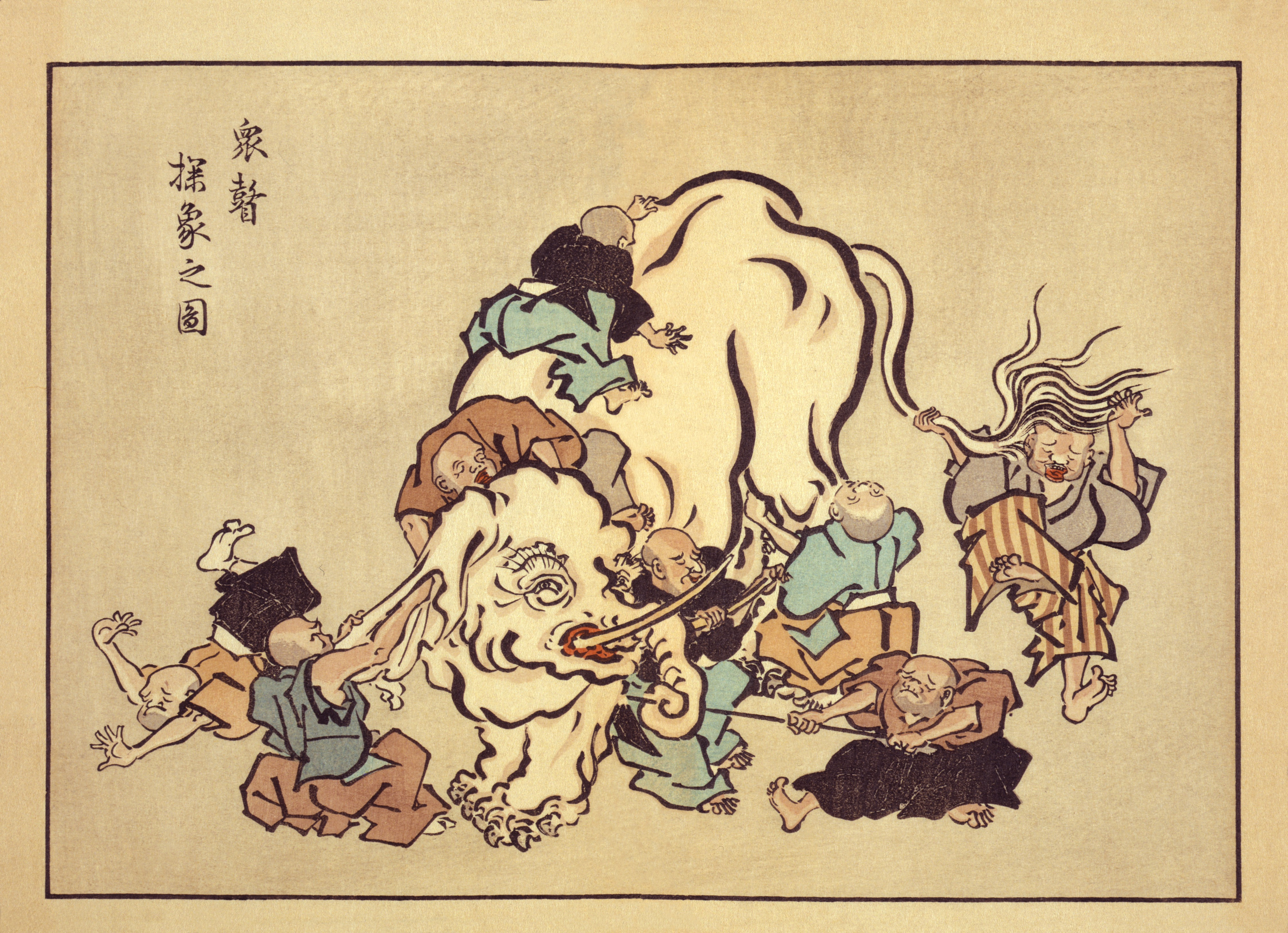
Blind monks examining an elephant, an ukiyo-e print by Hanabusa Itchō (1652–1724)

The Buddha twice uses the simile of blind men led astray. The earliest known version was recorded in the one of Buddhist scriptures, known as Tittha Sutta.

In another scripture known as Canki Sutta, the Buddha describes a row of blind men holding on to each other as an example of those who follow an old text that has passed down from generation to generation. In the Udana (68–69) he uses the elephant parable to describe sectarian quarrels. A king invited a group of blind men in the capital to be brought to the palace, where an elephant is brought in and they are asked to describe it.

When the blind men had each felt a part of the elephant, the king went to each of them and said to each: "Well, blind man, have you seen the elephant? Tell me, what sort of thing is an elephant?"

The men assert the elephant is either like a pot (the blind man who felt the elephant's head), a winnowing basket (ear), a plowshare (tusk), a plow (trunk), a granary (body), a pillar (foot), a mortar (back), a pestle (tail) or a brush (tip of the tail).

The men cannot agree with one another and come to blows over the question of what it is like and their dispute delights the king. The Buddha ends the story by comparing the blind men to preachers and scholars who are blind and ignorant and hold to their own views: "Just so are these preachers and scholars holding various views blind and unseeing.... In their ignorance they are by nature quarrelsome, wrangling, and disputatious, each maintaining reality is thus and thus." The Buddha then speaks the following verse:

O how they cling and wrangle, some who claim
For preacher and monk the honored name!
For, quarreling, each to his view they cling.
Such folk see only one side of a thing.

=== Sufism ===
The Persian Sufi poet Sanai (1080–1131/1141 CE) of Ghazni (currently, Afghanistan) presented this teaching story in his The Walled Garden of Truth.

Rumi, the 13th Century Persian poet and teacher of Sufism, included it in his Masnavi. In his retelling, "The Elephant in the Dark", some Hindus bring an elephant to be exhibited in a dark room. A number of men touch and feel the elephant in the dark and, depending upon where they touch it, they believe the elephant to be like a water spout (trunk), a fan (ear), a pillar (leg) and a throne (back). Rumi uses this story as an example of the limits of individual perception:

The sensual eye is just like the palm of the hand. The palm has not the means of covering the whole of the beast.

Rumi does not present a resolution to the conflict in his version, but states:

The eye of the Sea is one thing and the foam another. Let the foam go, and gaze with the eye of the Sea. Day and night foam-flecks are flung from the sea: oh amazing! You behold the foam but not the Sea. We are like boats dashing together; our eyes are darkened, yet we are in clear water.

Rumi ends his poem by stating "If each had a candle and they went in together the differences would disappear."

== Meaning as a proverb by language ==
=== Japanese ===
In Japanese, the proverb (群盲象を評す) is used as a simile of circumstance that ordinary men often fail to understand a great man or his great work.

=== Chinese ===
In Chinese, the proverb (盲人摸象) means failure to see the whole picture, for example, due to improper generalization.

== Modern treatments ==
=== Variants of the story ===
One of the most famous versions of the 19th century was the poem "The Blind Men and the Elephant" by John Godfrey Saxe (1816–1887):

It was six men of Indostan
To learning much inclined,
Who went to see the Elephant
(Though all of them were blind),
That each by observation
Might satisfy his mind

Moral:
So oft in theologic wars,
The disputants, I ween,
Rail on in utter ignorance
Of what each other mean,
And prate about an Elephant
Not one of them has seen!

In the poem, each man concluded that the elephant was like a wall, snake, spear, tree, fan or rope, depending upon where they had touched. Their heated debate comes short of physical violence, but the conflict was never resolved.

An elephant joke inverts the story in the following way, with the act of observation severely and fatally altering the subject of investigation:

Six blind elephants were discussing what men were like. After arguing they decided to find one and determine what it was like by direct experience. The first blind elephant felt the man and declared, 'Men are flat.' After the other blind elephants felt the man, they agreed.

Moral:

We have to remember that what we observe is not nature in itself, but nature exposed to our method of questioning.

— Werner Heisenberg

=== Commentary ===
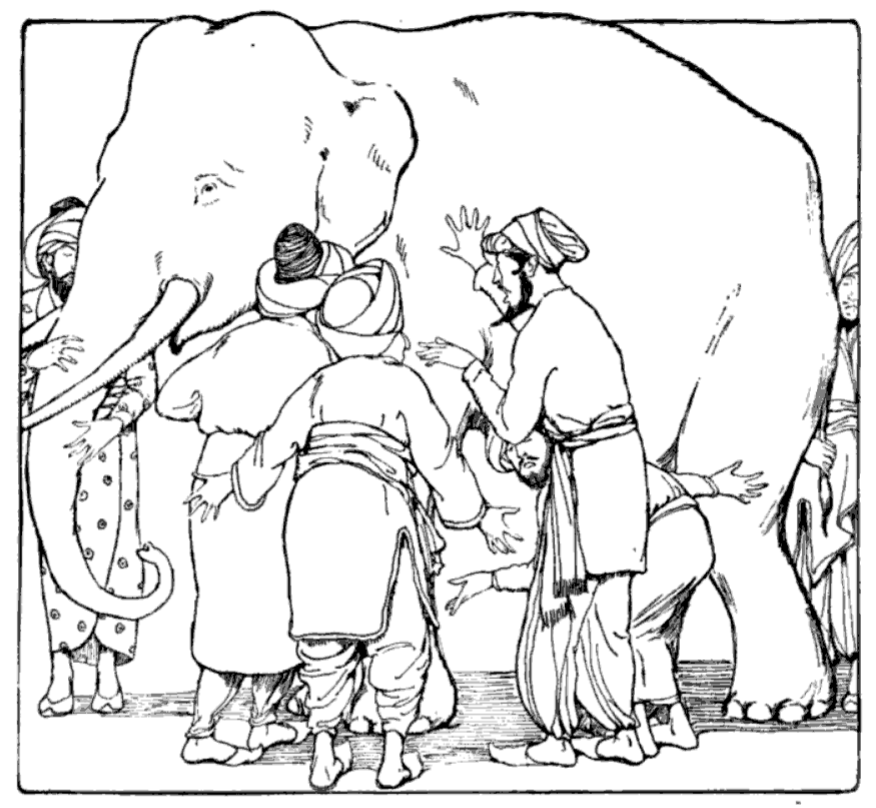
"Blind men and elephant", from the Holton-Curry Reader (by Martha Adelaide Holton & Charles Madison Curry, 1914)

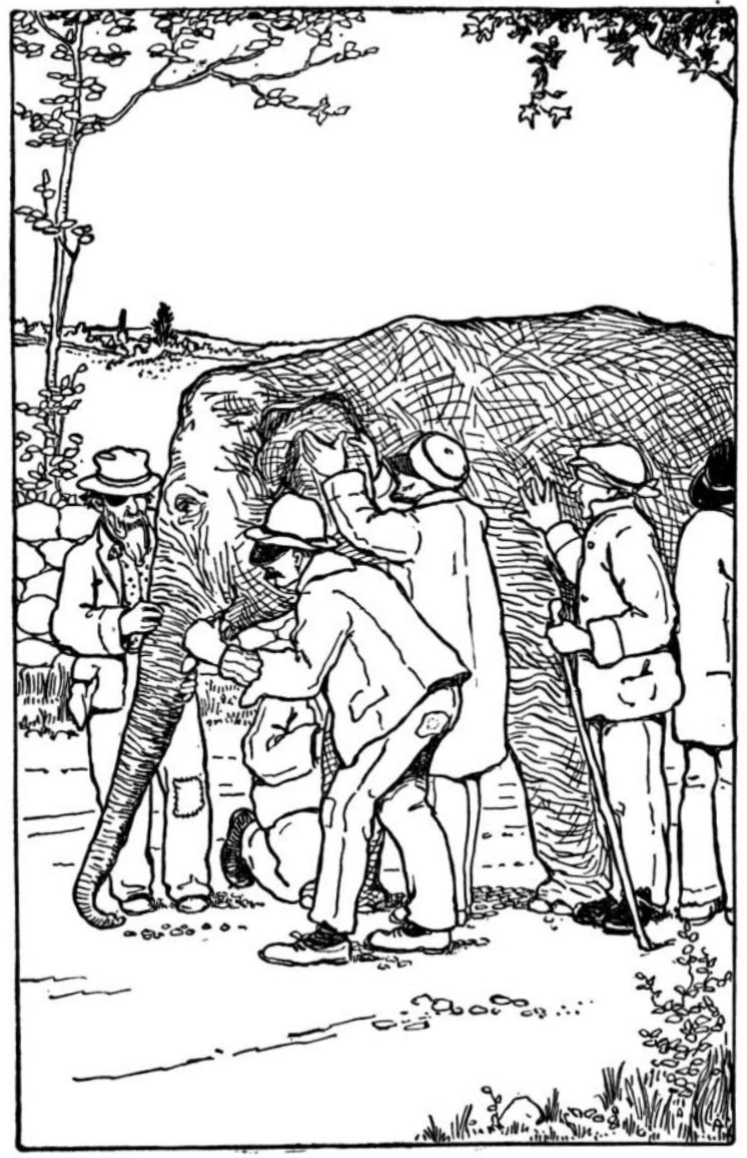
Blind men and elephant

Idries Shah commented on an element of self-reference by readers of the story in one of the many interpretations of the story, and its function as a teaching story:

...people address themselves to this story in one or more [...] interpretations. They then accept or reject them. Now they can feel happy; they have arrived at an opinion about the matter. According to their conditioning they produce the answer. Now look at their answers. Some will say that this is a fascinating and touching allegory of the presence of God. Others will say that it is showing people how stupid mankind can be. Some say it is anti-scholastic. Others that it is just a tale copied by Rumi from Sanai – and so on.

Shah adapted the tale in his book The Dermis Probe. This version begins with a conference of scientists, from different fields of expertise, presenting their conflicting conclusions on the material upon which a camera is focused. As the camera slowly zooms out it gradually becomes clear that the material under examination is the hide of an African elephant. The words 'The Parts Are Greater Than The Whole' then appear on the screen. This retelling formed the script for a short four-minute film by the animator Richard Williams. The film was chosen as an Outstanding Film of the Year and was exhibited at the London and New York film festivals.

=== In science ===
The story is seen as a metaphor in many disciplines, being pressed into service as an analogy in fields well beyond the traditional. In physics, it has been seen as an analogy for the wave–particle duality. In biology, the way the blind men hold onto different parts of the elephant has been seen as a good analogy for the polyclonal B cell response or for the reasons why it is challenging to find new drugs to treat diseases such as cancer or Alzheimer's disease. In medicine, the story has also been used to describe situations where diseases such as chronic obstructive pulmonary disease (COPD) are treated as several other diseases instead.

=== In literature ===
The Russian preface to a collection of Lewis Carroll's works (including such books as A Tangled Tale) includes the story as an analogy to the impression one gets from reading a few articles about Carroll, with him only being seen as a writer and poet by some, and a mediocre mathematician by others. The full picture, however, is that "Carroll only resembles Carroll the way an elephant only resembles an elephant".

=== In media ===
The story enjoys a continuing appeal in media, as shown by the number of illustrated children's books of the fable; for example, the children's book Seven Blind Mice, by Ed Young (1992) and one by Paul Galdone. In the title cartoon of one of his books, cartoonist Sam Gross postulated that one of the blind men, encountering a pile of the elephant feces, concluded that "An elephant is soft and mushy."

Touching the Elephant was a 1997 BBC Radio 4 documentary in which four people of varying ages, all blind from birth, were brought to London Zoo to touch an elephant and describe their response.

Ship of Theseus, a 2012 Indian philosophical drama named after the eponymous thought experiment, also references the parable.

Natalie Merchant sang Saxe's poem in full on her Leave Your Sleep album.

The name of Michael Nesmith's Grammy award-winning 1981 music video special 'Elephant Parts' references the parable.

The Adult Swim 2025 TV animated special, The Elephant, references the parable through its title and its last act. It is also a nod to the experimental approach to the production of the special, where three creative teams were asked to create and direct a specific act of the special without any knowledge what the other teams were creating.

== See also ==
- Allegory of the cave, a rough equivalent in Western philosophy
- Anekantavada
- Black cat analogy
- Dispersed knowledge
- Duck test
- Elephant in the room
- Flatland: A Romance of Many Dimensions, an 1884 satirical novella
- Hasty generalization
- Naïve realism (psychology)
- Rashomon effect – Unreliability of eyewitnesses
- Seeing pink elephants – Euphemism for hallucinations caused by alcohol
- Seeing the elephant – American figure of speech
- Syncretism – Combination of distinct beliefs or schools of thought
- The blind leading the blind
- The Country of the Blind
- Tittha Sutta (From Udāna)
- Unreliable narrator
