= Hanabusa =

Hanabusa (written: 英 or 花房) is a Japanese surname. Notable people with the surname include:

- Colleen Hanabusa (1951–2026), American politician
- Hanabusa Itchō (英 一蝶; 1652–1724), Japanese painter, calligrapher, and haiku poet
- Hanabusa Itchō II (二代 英 一蝶; 1677–1737), son and pupil of Hanabusa Itchō
- Hanabusa Masayuki (花房 正幸; 1524–1605), Japanese samurai
- Shinzō Hanabusa (英 伸三; born 1936), Japanese photographer
- Tsutomu Hanabusa (英 勉), Japanese film director
- Yōko Hanabusa (英 洋子), Japanese manga artist
- Hanabusa Yoshitada (花房 義質; 1842–1917), Japanese politician and diplomat
- Yuriko Hanabusa (英 百合子; 1900–1970), Japanese actress
