= The Dermis Probe =

1970 book by Idries Shah

- First edition
- Author: Idries Shah
- Language: English and Spanish as La Exploración Dérmica: The Dermis Probe
- Genre: Sufi Literature, Sufism.
- Publisher: Jonathan Cape
- Publication date: 1970
- Publication place: United Kingdom
- Media type: Print (Hardback & Paperback)
- ISBN: 9781784790486 (paperback edition)
- OCLC: 20797786
- Preceded by: Wisdom of the Idiots
- Followed by: Thinkers of the East: Studies in Experientialism

The Dermis Probe is a book by Idries Shah published by Octagon Press in 1970. A paperback edition was published in 1989 and again in 1993. The stories presented in the book are also available in an audio format.

Shortly before he died, Shah stated that his books form a complete course that could fulfil the function he had fulfilled while alive. The Dermis Probe can therefore be read as part of a course of study on Sufism.

== Content ==
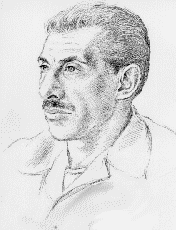
Idries Shah

The Dermis Probe is a collection of teaching stories and proverbs drawn from Sufi tradition. The book also contains a section of supporting notes;

"These notes are of varying subject: sometimes amplification of the theme, sometimes book references, sometimes biographical; some stories, too, have no note at all, though not many, being either self-explanatory or – in Sufi style – entities in themselves which should not be interfered with."

The title piece is a modern retelling of the "Blind men and an elephant", from the Tittha Sutta, a scripture included in one of the oldest texts in the Pali Canon of Theravāda Buddhism. This story was then published by Sanai of Ghazna in Afghanistan and later by Sanai's student, the poet and mystic Jalaludin Rumi in his Masnavi in the latter half of the thirteenth century.

Shah's adaptation begins with a conference of scientists, from different fields of expertise, presenting their distorted conclusions on the material which the camera is focused upon. As the camera slowly zooms out it becomes clear for the first time that the material under examination is the hide of an African elephant. The words "The Parts Are Greater Than The Whole" then appear on the screen.

This retelling formed the script for a short four-minute film by the animator Richard Williams. The film was chosen as an Outstanding Film of the Year and was exhibited at the London and New York City film festivals.

== Reception ==
The Guardian review commented that; "Shah's materials take people by surprise...such a sharp angle to our current conventions...like a peep-show into a world which most people do not imagine exists."

The New York Times book review wrote that "...The Dermis Probe develops the theme of patterns of material – arrangements: it is necessary to remember that the position of a story and its relation to others – which may be in other volumes – can be important."
