= The Elephant in the Dark (book) =

2016 book by Idries Shah

- Paperback book cover (2016 edition)
- Author: Idries Shah
- Cover artist: Renata Alvares
- Language: English
- Genre: Religion, Sufi Literature, Islam, Comparative Religion.
- Publisher: ISF Publishing
- Publication date: 2016
- Publication place: United Kingdom
- Media type: Print (paperback, eBook)
- ISBN: 9781784791025 Paperback edition
- Preceded by: The Magic Monastery
- Followed by: A Veiled Gazelle

The Elephant in the Dark is a book by the writer Idries Shah, based on lectures he delivered at the University of Geneva as Visiting Professor in 1972–1973. He was invited to speak on the topic of “Salvation as a total surrender to God: an attempt at dialogue between Christians and Muslims.”

The book was published by Octagon Press in 1974 and is due to be republished in new paperback, ebook and audiobook editions by The Idries Shah Foundation from 1 March 2016.

Shortly before he died, Shah stated that his books form a complete course that could fulfil the function he had fulfilled while alive. As such, The Elephant in the Dark can be read as part of a whole course of study.

== Content ==
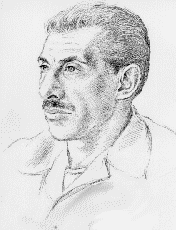
Idries Shah

The title, The Elephant in the Dark, is from the traditional Eastern fable of the blind men and an elephant, in which different people experience an elephant differently according to their subjectivities. Award-winning writer and later winner of the 2007 Nobel Prize in Literature, Doris Lessing writes that it is used here to refer to "the long interaction between Christianity and Islam, even during the thousand years we were at war or hostile: sometimes in secret and kept out of the knowledge of rulers and court; sometimes with the aid of the said rulers; sometimes – and much more than we know – open and thriving, but since fallen into oblivion, or concealed because such amity was a threat to the machinery of national hostilities ..."

Shah gives examples of the interlocking history of Christianity and Islam, starting from the life and times of the Islamic prophet Muhammad, through the Middle Ages, and up to the present day. His method is to show where scholars from East and West have unearthed important materials, and then to illustrate large and complex themes by exemplary anecdotes or quotations instead of lengthy exegesis or dry intellectualism. As a result, Lessing says, books like this one by Shah are "a salutary reminder as to what is possible in scholarly writing: it is admirable above all for its economy, its elegant pithiness. When you have finished with even a little book, like this one, you find yourself in possession of the necessary basic information."

Shah emphasizes that both Christians and Muslims need to learn more about each other. In the case of Muslims, respect for Christianity is built into the foundations of Islam in the Quran, and Jesus is regarded as a pillar of their religion. Muhammad himself lay down the foundations of respect for Christianity both by precept and by example, although there was a difference between what he taught and what his successors made of it. Christians in the West, on the other hand, have been much more lacking in accurate information about, and appreciation for, Islam.

Shah provides an exposition of the basic Arabic triconsonantal root "SLM" and its associated word groupings: Islam, Muslim, Salem, salaam, and so on, to explain: "It is impossible to exaggerate the significance of this constellation of terms and meanings; for the Arab speaker they constitute a constant reminder of the diverse aspects of their religion and its meanings, and a permanent facility for confirming these concepts without having to rely only upon interpretation by later ideologists."

He also uses illustrations taken from the Sufi mystical tradition; for instance, Al-Ghazali's tale of the "Seven Valleys", accepted by both Muslims and Christians as a map or a guide of the journey to God.

Shah's previous books on Sufism illustrated that there are many ways of approaching mysticism, including secular and physicalist frameworks, while this book illustrates the "religious road to that place where all the ways lead – surrender, submission."

== Reception ==
In 1974, Doris Lessing writes in New Society: "This book aims at redressing balances; and to say what we have in common, on what we can build” and that it “seems to be essential at a time when [...] the two religions which have shaped our respective cultures are engaged in deliberate and self-conscious attempts to overcome barriers which humanity can no longer afford."

Also in 1974, Edward Campbell, literary editor of The Evening News writes that "Shah seems to suggest that the time is ripe for a true ecumenism” in which “Christianity and Islam, each preserving its essential nature, might recognise the validity of a union, if not of doctrine, at least of spirit," adding that "the combination might well be a third force that could transform a very sick world."
