= The Magic Monastery =

- First edition
- Author: Idries Shah
- Language: English
- Genre: Sufism
- Published: 1972
- Publisher: Jonathan Cape
- Publication place: United Kingdom
- Media type: Print (Paperback), and E-book.
- Pages: 216
- ISBN: 9780224006774
- OCLC: 924880874
- Preceded by: Thinkers of the East
- Followed by: The Elephant in the Dark – Christianity, Islam and the Sufis

The Magic Monastery is a collection of teaching stories from the Sufi mystical tradition, by the writer Idries Shah, together with some stories by the author himself.

The work was first published by the Octagon Press in 1972. ISF Publishing, sponsored by The Idries Shah Foundation, published a paperback edition on 2017, followed by the e-book version which can be read online at the ISF official website.

Shortly before he died, Shah stated that his books form a complete course that could fulfil the function he had performed while alive. As such, The Magic Monastery can be read as part of a whole course of study.

== Summary ==
The Magic Monastery with the subtitle Analogical and Action Philosophy of the Middle East and Central Asia, contains traditional teaching stories as well as pieces composed by Idries Shah. The author writes in the preface: "It consists of a representative cross-section of Sufi teaching which constitutes a harmonized whole rather than a selection of typical extracts."

== Reception ==
In the August 1972 edition of Encounter magazine, Doris Lessing described the work as "a particularly and intriguingly informative" "textbook for students".

The book was featured in The Observer Review's Book of the Year on 17 December 1972, where it was described as "remarkable for its precise response to the real and inner needs of the time."

In October 1972, writing in the journal Asian Affairs, historian L. F. Rushbrook Williams described The Magic Monastery as "accurately expressing Sufi thought and practice in vivid terms easily comprehensible to readers" and wrote that it illustrates "the manner in which Sufi practice, with its devastating criticism of purely academic learning and its continuing Socratic search for truth at any cost, exercises a powerful appeal to many thoughtful people in the West."

On June 5, 1972, the Worcester Evening News wrote that book contained "an enormous amount of commonsense" and that the reader "will become amused, educated, immersed."

A reviewer wrote in the Huddersfield Daily Examiner on 22 June 1972 that the book "offers much in the way of contemplation and hope, a respite from the ills of modern society."

In the London Evening News on 5 April 5, 1972, the reviewer wrote that the book "...prob[ed] gently into deeper levels of the mind and echo[ed] with what might be conscience."

In the Kingston Borough News, on 19 January 1973, the reviewer was of the opinion that "You won't be quite the same person when you have read this book." and rated the work as "Highly recommended."

Writer, novelist and philosopher, Colin Wilson in his review of The Magic Monastery noted that Shah "is not primarily concerned with propagating some secret doctrine. He is concerned with the method by which mystical knowledge is transmitted... The Sufis transmit knowledge through direct intuition rather in the manner of the Zen masters, and one of the chief means of doing this is by means of brief stories and parables which work their way into the subconscious and activate its hidden forces."

Noted psychiatrist Arthur Deikman, in his book The Observing Self, also mentions tales found in The Magic Monastery as examples of stories that can indirectly communicate important teachings, for instance, by illustrating the difficulty in describing mystical perception to those who've never experienced it.
