= Holton-Curry Reader =

Children's book series

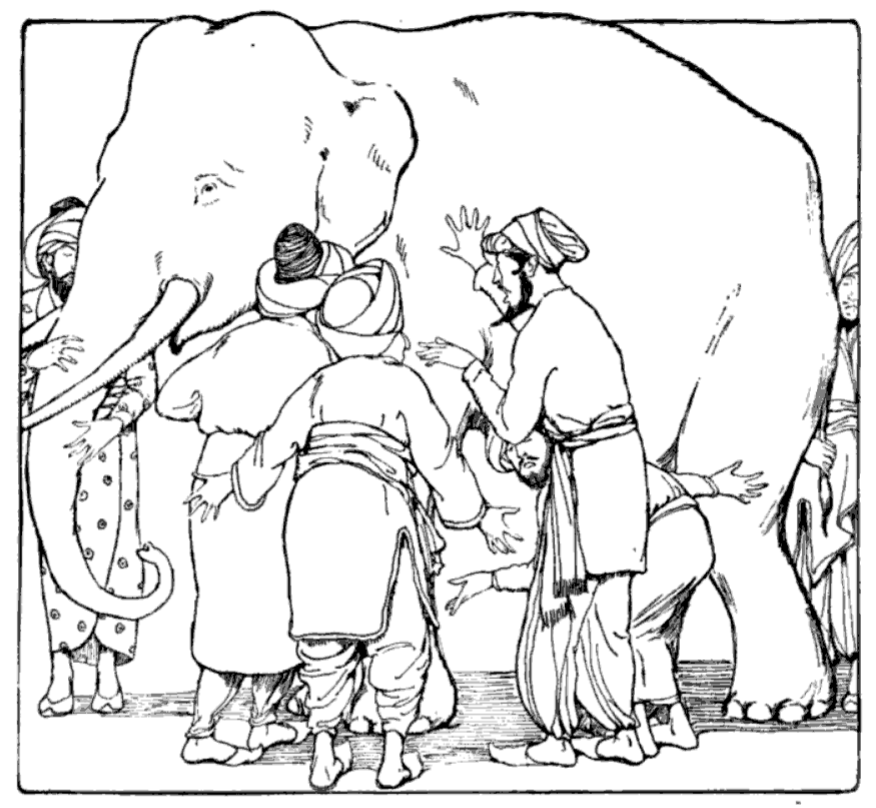
An illustration of the "Blind men and elephant", from the Holton-Curry Reader (by Martha Adelaide Holton & Charles Madison Curry, 1914).

The Holton-Curry Reader is a basal reader in 8 volumes for the elementary grades, which was published by Rand McNally in 1914, compiled by Martha Adelaide Holton and Charles Madison Curry.
