= Tittha Sutta =

Buddhist scripture in Pāli Canon

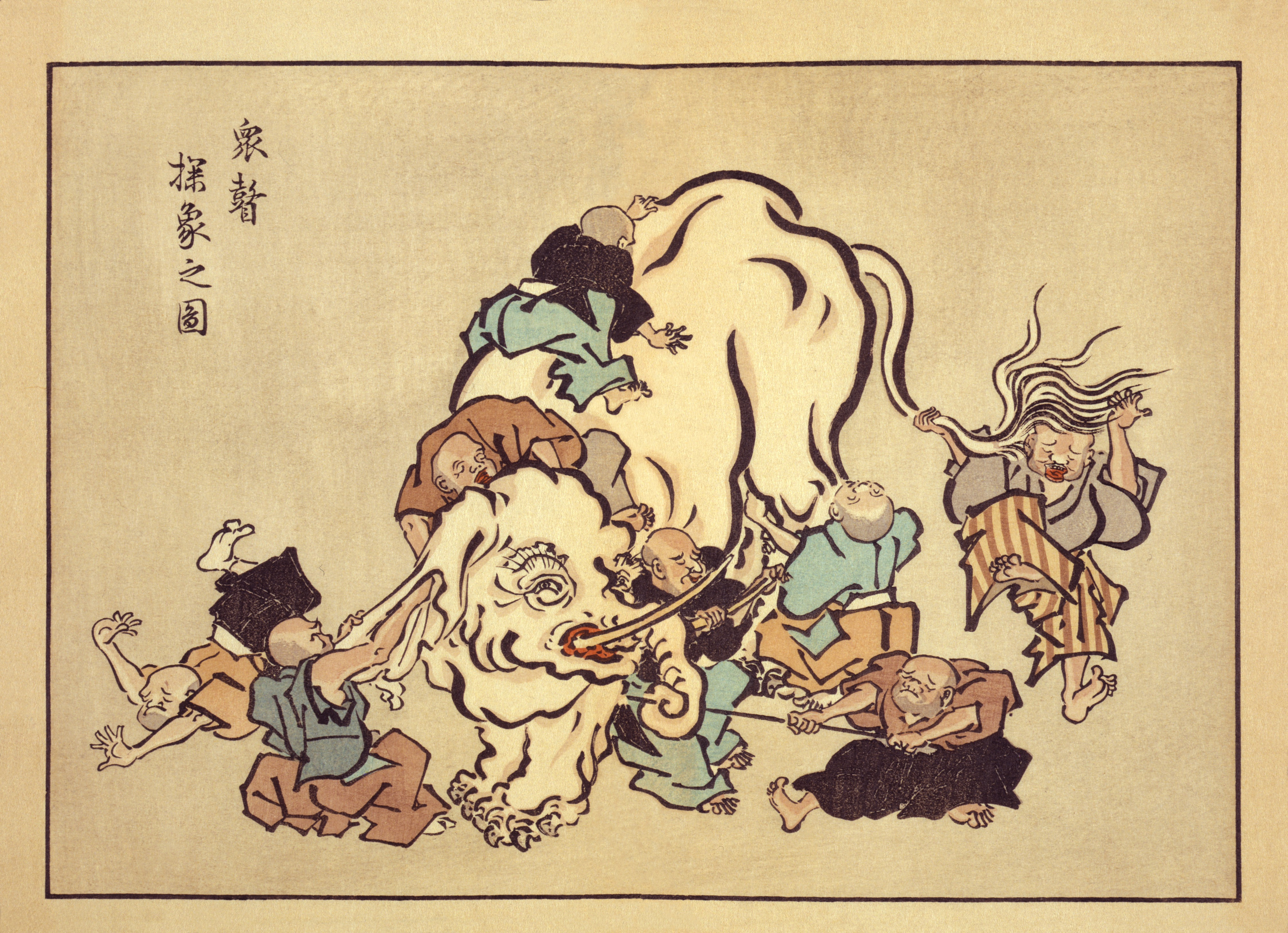
Blind monks examining an elephant, a ukiyo-e by the Japanese painter Hanabusa Itchō (1652–1724).

Tittha Sutta is a Buddhist scripture in Udāna, the third book in the fifth collection of Sutta Pitaka, known as Khuddaka Nikāya. Udana is one of the oldest texts in the Pali Canon of Theravāda Buddhism. Tittha Sutta contains a famous parable that has spread widely in the world, also to other cultures and views, the parable of the blind men and the elephant.

== Division and structure ==
Udāna consists of eight chapters ( cradle ) with ten conversations or sutras each, ie. 80 calls. Each sutra consists of a long story or parable and a short concluding udāna, or exclamation, from the Buddha. about "The chapter on being blind from birth". The sutras have the following order: I. Āyusama-osajjana Sutta II. Paṭisalla Sutta III. "Ahu Sutta" IV. "'Tittha Sutta' ' V. Tittha Sutta WE. "'Tittha Sutta' ' VII. Subhūti Sutta VIII. Gaṇika Sutta IX. Adhipataka Sutta / Upāti Sutta X. Uppajjanti Sutta Tittha Suttha comprises three of these sutras, where the parable of the monks and the elephant is found in the first, viz. sutra number 4. The parable is usually referred to as "The story of the blind men and the elephant".

== The parable of the Buddha ==
The scripture is about some monks (Bhikkhus) who hear some ascetic Hindus in lively argumentation about whether the world is eternal or not, infinite or not, whether the soul is separate from the body or not. They then consulted The Buddha who taught them the parable of the blind men and the elephant: A king has taken an elephant to his palace and asks the city's blind men to examine it. When the men felt each part of the elephant, the king asked them, each one, to describe what an elephant is. One man has felt the elephant's head and describes it as a pot, another has felt it on the ear and describes it as a basket or a sieve. Someone has felt the pastures and describes a plow beetle and someone has felt the legs and talks about tree trunks. They have all experienced the elephant in different ways and can not agree on what an elephant is. Their conclusions are completely different and they end up in a heated dispute. The moral of the matter is that it is a waste of time and energy to determine what it is you are experiencing, as this will necessarily be different.

== Canki Sutta ==
The Buddha used the parable of the blind men at least twice. The parable in Tittha Sutta is the older of the two famous texts. The Buddha also used the parable in Canki Sutta, which is part of Majjhima Nikāya which is the second Nikāya, or the collection in Sutta-Pitaka. Canki Sutta is included in the middle part of nikayan, Majjhimapaṇṇāsapāḷi, in the chapter Brāhmaṇa Vagga, where it is sutta number 95.

== Modern use of the parable ==
The parable has spread widely in the world, also to other cultures and views. It is therefore not always known when it is told what its origin is - in Buddhism, Hinduism and Jainism. It is therefore occasionally attributed to both Christian sources and the American poet John Godfrey Saxe.

== See also ==
- Early Buddhist Texts
- Khuddaka Nikaya
- Udāna
