= Thinkers of the East =

Thinkers of the East - Studies in Experientialism
- Author: Idries Shah
- Language: English
- Genre: Eastern philosophy and culture, Sufism, Sufi Literature
- Publisher: Jonathan Cape
- Publication date: 1971
- Publication place: United Kingdom
- Media type: Print (Paperback eBook & Audiobook)
- OCLC: 959607677
- Preceded by: The Dermis Probe
- Followed by: The Magic Monastery

First published in 1971, Thinkers of the East: Studies in Experientialism was one of several books of Eastern practical philosophy study materials selected and arranged by Idries Shah for a contemporary readership.

Shortly before he died, Shah stated that his books form a complete course that could fulfil the function he had fulfilled while alive. As such, Thinkers of the East can be read as part of a whole course of study.

== Summary ==
Thinkers of the East consists of a series of anecdotes and brief recorded conversations between thinkers and questioners, mingled with occasional extracts, stories and legends (including "The Legend of Nasrudin"). The preface asserts that the book's content is "arranged in a manner commanded by the tradition and not by superficialist obsessional arranging."

As the book's subtitle Studies in Experientialism suggests, these illustrate Sufi thinking in action, rather than in theory. On the principle that it is for the reader to dwell, not the author, the narratives are related with a deliberate economy: enough detail to provoke thought, but too little to flood it.

In The New York Times, Doris Lessing writes: "in its claims and statements about the role of contemporary Sufism [Thinkers of the East] is more open than any of Shah's books."

== Reception ==
The Times Literary Supplement noted that the book would mainly "appeal to the modern man who finds current materialistic outlooks and attitudes insufficient to his needs." Doris Lessing, a long-time student of Shah's work, reviewed the book in the New York Times Book Review, noting that terms like "worship", "the fear of God" etc. could "be seen as technical terms, with a precise meaning." The Stanford University professor Robert Ornstein, commenting in Psychology Today, commented that this was "perhaps the most explicit book on the nature and function of Sufi teaching – and perhaps the most remedial."
