= Āhrīkya =

Translations of Āhrīkya
- English: lack of shame lack of consciousness shamelessness
- Sanskrit: आह्रीक्य (IAST: āhrīkya)
- Pali: ahirika
- Burmese: အဟိီရိက
- Chinese: 無慚
- Indonesian: tidak tahu malu
- Khmer: អហិរិក , អហិរិកៈ (UNGEGN: ahek-rek, ahek-rekak)
- Tibetan: ངོ་ཚ་མེད་པ། (Wylie: ngo tsha med pa; THL: ngotsa mepa)
- Vietnamese: Vô Tàm

Āhrīkya (Sanskrit; Pali: ahirika; Tibetan phonetic: ngotsa mepa) is a Buddhist term that is translated as "lack of shame", "lack of conscience", etc. In the Theravada tradition, ahirika is defined as the absence of disgust at physical or verbal misconduct. In the Mahayana tradition, āhrīkya is defined as not restraining from wrongdoing due to one's own conscience.

Āhrīkya is identified as:

- One of the fourteen unwholesome mental factors within the Theravada Abhidharma teachings
- One of the twenty secondary unwholesome factors within the Mahayana Abhidharma teachings

== Explanations ==
=== Theravada ===
In the Visuddhimagga (XIV, 160), ahirika (consciencelessness) is defined together with anottappa (shamelessness) as follows:

Herein, it has no conscientious scruples, thus it is consciencelessness (ahirika). It is unashamed, thus it is shamelessness (anottappa). Of these, ahirika has the characteristic of absence of disgust at bodily misconduct, etc., or it has the characteristic of immodesty. Anottappa has the characteristic of absence of dread on their account, or it has the characteristic of absence of anxiety about them...

Nina van Gorkom explains:

The two cetasikas shamelessness and recklessness seem to be very close in meaning, but they have different characteristics. Shamelessness does not shrink from evil because it is not ashamed of it and does not abhor it. The “Paramattha Mañjūsā” compares it to a domestic pig which does not abhor filth. Defilements (kilesa) are like filth, they are unclean, impure. Shamelessness does not abhor defilements, be it attachment, aversion, ignorance, avarice, jealousy, conceit or any other kind of unwholesomeness.

As to recklessness, it does not abhor, draw back from evil because it does not see the danger of akusala and it does not fear its consequences such as an unhappy rebirth. The “Paramattha Mañjūsā” compares recklessness to a moth which is attracted to the fire, although this is dangerous for it. Are we enslaved by pleasant experiences? We may even commit evil through body, speech or mind on account of them. Then recklessness does not fear the danger of akusala, it does not care about the consequences of akusala.

=== Mahayana ===
The Abhidharma-samuccaya states:

What is shamelessness (ahrīkya)? It is not restraining oneself by taking one's perversions as one's norm. It is an emotional event associated with passion-lust (raga), aversion-hatred (dvesha), and bewilderment-erring (moha). It aids all basic and proximate emotions.

Alexander Berzin explains:

No moral self-dignity (ngo-tsha med-pa, no sense of honor) is a part of any of the three poisonous emotions. It is the lack of any sense to refrain from destructive behavior because of caring how our actions reflect on ourselves. According to Vasubandhu, this subsidiary awareness means having no sense of values. It is a lack of respect for positive qualities or persons possessing them.

== See also ==
- Mental factors (Buddhism)
- anapatrāpya

== Sources ==
- Berzin, Alexander (2006), Primary Minds and the 51 Mental Factors
- Bhikkhu Bodhi (2003), A Comprehensive Manual of Abhidhamma, Pariyatti Publishing
- Guenther, Herbert V. & Leslie S. Kawamura (1975), Mind in Buddhist Psychology: A Translation of Ye-shes rgyal-mtshan's "The Necklace of Clear Understanding" Dharma Publishing. Kindle Edition.
- Kunsang, Erik Pema (translator) (2004). Gateway to Knowledge, Vol. 1. North Atlantic Books.
- Nina van Gorkom (2010), Cetasikas, Zolag
- Rhys Davids, T.W. & William Stede (eds.) (1921–25), The Pali Text Society’s Pali–English dictionary. (Chipstead: Pali Text Society).
