= Anapatrapya =

Translations of Anapatrapya
- English: lack of propriety disregard shamelessness
- Sanskrit: anapatrapya, anapatrāpya
- Pali: anottappa
- Chinese: 無愧
- Indonesian: tidak takut berbuat jahat
- Tibetan: ཁྲེལ་མེད་པ། (Wylie: khrel med pa; THL: trel mepa)
- Vietnamese: Vô úy

Anapatrapya (Sanskrit; Pali: anottappa; Tibetan phonetic: trel mepa) is a Buddhist term that is translated as "lack of propriety", "disregard", etc. In the Theravada tradition, anottappa is defined as the absence of dread on account of misconduct. In the Mahayana tradition, anapatrapya is defined as engaging in non-virtue without inhibition on account of others.

Anapatrapya (Pali: anottappa) is identified as:

- One of the fourteen unwholesome mental factors within the Theravada Abhidharma teachings
- One of the twenty secondary unwholesome factors within the Mahayana Abhidharma teachings

== Explanations ==
=== Theravada ===
In the Visuddhimagga (XIV, 160), anottappa (shamelessness) is defined together with ahirika (consciencelessness) as follows:

Herein, it has no conscientious scruples, thus it is consciencelessness (ahirika). It is unashamed, thus it is shamelessness (anottappa). Of these, ahirika has the characteristic of absence of disgust at bodily misconduct, etc., or it has the characteristic of immodesty. Anottappa has the characteristic of absence of dread on their account, or it has the characteristic of absence of anxiety about them...

Nina van Gorkom explains:

The two cetasikas shamelessness and recklessness seem to be very close in meaning, but they have different characteristics. Shamelessness does not shrink from evil because it is not ashamed of it and does not abhor it. The “Paramattha Mañjūsā” compares it to a domestic pig which does not abhor filth. Defilements (kilesa) are like filth, they are unclean, impure. Shamelessness does not abhor defilements, be it attachment, aversion, ignorance, avarice, jealousy, conceit or any other kind of unwholesomeness.

As to recklessness, it does not abhor, draw back from evil because it does not see the danger of akusala and it does not fear its consequences such as an unhappy rebirth. The “Paramattha Mañjūsā” compares recklessness to a moth which is attracted to the fire, although this is dangerous for it. Are we enslaved by pleasant experiences? We may even commit evil through body, speech or mind on account of them. Then recklessness does not fear the danger of akusala, it does not care about the consequences of akusala.

=== Mahayana ===
The Abhidharma-samuccaya states:

What is anapatrapya? It is not restraining oneself by taking others as the norm. It is an emotional event associated with passion-lust (raga), aversion-hatred (dvesha), and bewilderment-erring (moha). It aids the basic emotions and the proximate emotions.

Mipham Rinpoche states:

Shamelessness means to personally engage in what is unvirtuous without inhibition on account of others. It belongs to the categories of the three poisons and helps all the disturbing emotions.

Alexander Berzin explains:

No care for how our actions reflect on others (khrel-med) is a part of any of the three poisonous emotions. It is the lack of any sense to refrain from destructive behavior because of caring how our actions reflect on those connected to us. Such persons may include our family, teachers, social group, ethnic group, religious order, or countrymen. For Vasubandhu, this subsidiary awareness means having no scruples, and is a lack of restraint from being brazenly negative. This and the previous subsidiary awareness (āhrīkya) accompany all destructive states of mind.

== See also ==
- Mental factors (Buddhism)
- āhrīkya

== Sources ==
- Berzin, Alexander (2006), Primary Minds and the 51 Mental Factors
- Bhikkhu Bodhi (2003), A Comprehensive Manual of Abhidhamma, Pariyatti Publishing
- Guenther, Herbert V. & Leslie S. Kawamura (1975), Mind in Buddhist Psychology: A Translation of Ye-shes rgyal-mtshan's "The Necklace of Clear Understanding" Dharma Publishing. Kindle Edition.
- Kunsang, Erik Pema (translator) (2004). Gateway to Knowledge, Vol. 1. North Atlantic Books.
- Nina van Gorkom (2010), Cetasikas, Zolag
