= Martha Adelaide Holton =

American author and educator

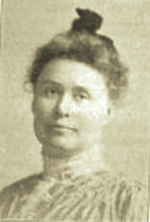
Martha Adelaide Holton

Martha Adelaide Holton (October 13, 1859 – January 6, 1947) was an American children's fiction author of the late 19th century and early 20th century.

She was supervisor of Primary Education in the Minneapolis Public Schools for 10 years. She wrote the Holton Primer (1901). She cowrote Industrial Work for Public Schools (1904) with Alice F. Rollins, which describes a variety of construction projects in different mediums: cardboard, paper, clay, weaving, whittling, sewing and iron work. She worked with Charles Madison Curry to create the Holton-Curry Reader, a basal reader in 8 volumes for the elementary grades, which was published by Rand McNally in 1914.

Holton was born in Eaton, New York, to Joseph Holton and Martha, farmers from England.

== Books ==
- Holton Primer (1901)
- Industrial Work for Public Schools (1904; with Alice F. Rollins)
- Holton, Martha Adelaide (1905). Games, Seat Work, and Sense Training. Chicago: Flanagan.
