= Udāna =

- SuttaCentral; OpenTipitaka
- Type: Canonical text
- Parent: Khuddaka Nikāya
- Attribution: Bhāṇaka
- Aṭṭhakathā: Paramatthadīpanī (Udāna-aṭṭhakathā)
- Commentator: Dhammapāla
- Abbreviation: Ud

The Udāna is a Buddhist scripture, part of the Pāli Canon of Theravāda Buddhism. It is included in the Sutta Piṭaka's Khuddaka Nikāya. The title might be translated "inspired utterances". The book comprises 80 such utterances, most in verse, each preceded by a narrative giving the context in which the Buddha uttered it.

The famous story of the Blind men and an elephant appears in Udana, under Tittha Sutta (Ud. 6.4).

== Structure of the Udana ==
The Udana is composed of eight chapters (vagga) of ten discourses each. The chapter titles are:

1. Bodhivagga (Awakening chapter)
2. Mucalindavagga (King Mucalinda chapter)
3. Nandavagga (Ven. Nanda chapter)
4. Meghiyavagga (Ven. Meghiya chapter)
5. Soṇavagga (Lay Follower Sona chapter)
6. Jaccandhavagga (Blind From Birth chapter)
7. Cūḷavagga (Minor chapter)
8. Pāṭaligāmiyavagga (Pāṭali Village chapter)

Each discourse includes a prose portion followed by a verse. At the end of each prose section, as prelude to the verse, the following formulaic text is included:

Then, on realizing the significance of that, the Blessed One on that occasion exclaimed:

An alternate translation could be: Then, upon realizing the significance of that, the Blessed One on that occasion exclaimed this inspired utterance (udāna):

Atha kho bhagavā etam-atthaṃ viditvā tāyaṃ velāyaṃ imaṃ udānaṃ udānesi:

It is from such "exclamations" (udāna) that the collection derives its name.

== Dating of text ==
This is one of the earlier Buddhist scriptures, A recent analysis concludes that the text of the Pāli discourses, including the Udāna, was largely fixed in its current form, with only small differences from the modern text, by the first century B.C.E.

Hinüber identifies this type of discourse (although not necessarily the existing collection itself) as being part of the pre-canonical navaṅga (Pāli for "nine-fold") which classified discourses according to their form and style, such as geyya (mixed prose and verse), gāthā (four-lined couplets), udāna (utterances) and jātaka (birth story).

== Relationship to other sacred texts ==
Within Buddhist literature, about a fourth of the Udana's prose sections correspond to text elsewhere in the Pāli Canon, particularly in the Vinaya. In addition, in regards to Tibetan Buddhist literature, von Hinüber suggests that the Udāna formed the original core of the Sanskrit Udānavarga, to which verses from the Dhammapada were added.

In terms of non-Buddhist texts, some Udāna concepts can be found in the Vedantic Upanishads and in Jain texts.

== Translations ==
- Tr Major-General D. M. Strong, 1902
- "Verses of uplift", in Minor Anthologies of the Pali Canon, volume II, tr F. L. Woodward, 1935, Pali Text Society, Bristol
- Tr John D. Ireland, Buddhist Publication Society, Kandy, Sri Lanka, 1990; later reprinted in 1 volume with his translation of the Itivuttaka
- Tr Peter Masefield, 1994, Pali Text Society, Bristol; the PTS's preferred translation; its declared aim is to translate in accordance with the commentary's interpretation
- Udāna: A Bilingual Pali-English Study Edition, 2010 Theravada Tipitaka Press
- Tr Ānandajoti Bhikkhu, Udāna. Exalted Utterances ; Last revised version 2008
- Tr Bhikkhu Mahinda (Anagarika Mahendra), Udānapāli: Book of Inspired Utterances, Bilingual Pali-English First Edition 2022, Dhamma Publishers, Roslindale MA; ISBN 9780999078181.
