= Hanabusa Itchō II =

Japanese painter

Hanabusa Itchō II (二代英一蝶, Nidai Hanabusa Icchō) (1677–1737) was the son and pupil of Japanese painter Hanabusa Itchō. He was also known as Hanabusa Taga, Nobukatsu, Chōhachi, and Mohachi.
