= Hanabusa Itchō =

Japanese artist

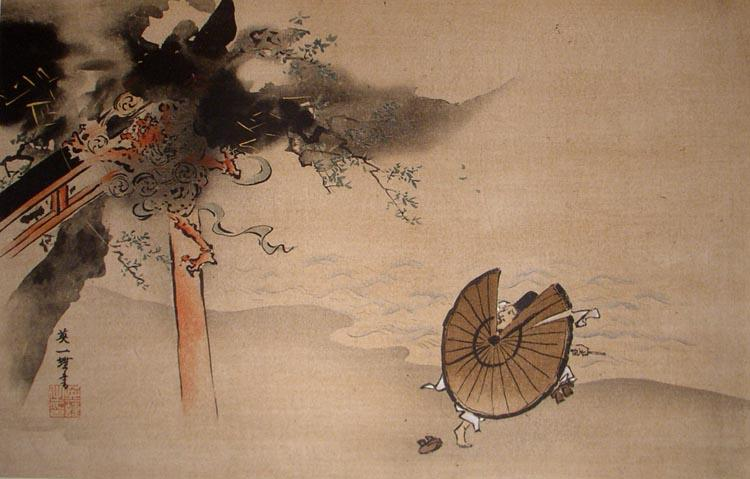
"The Falling Thunder God" by Hanabusa Itchō

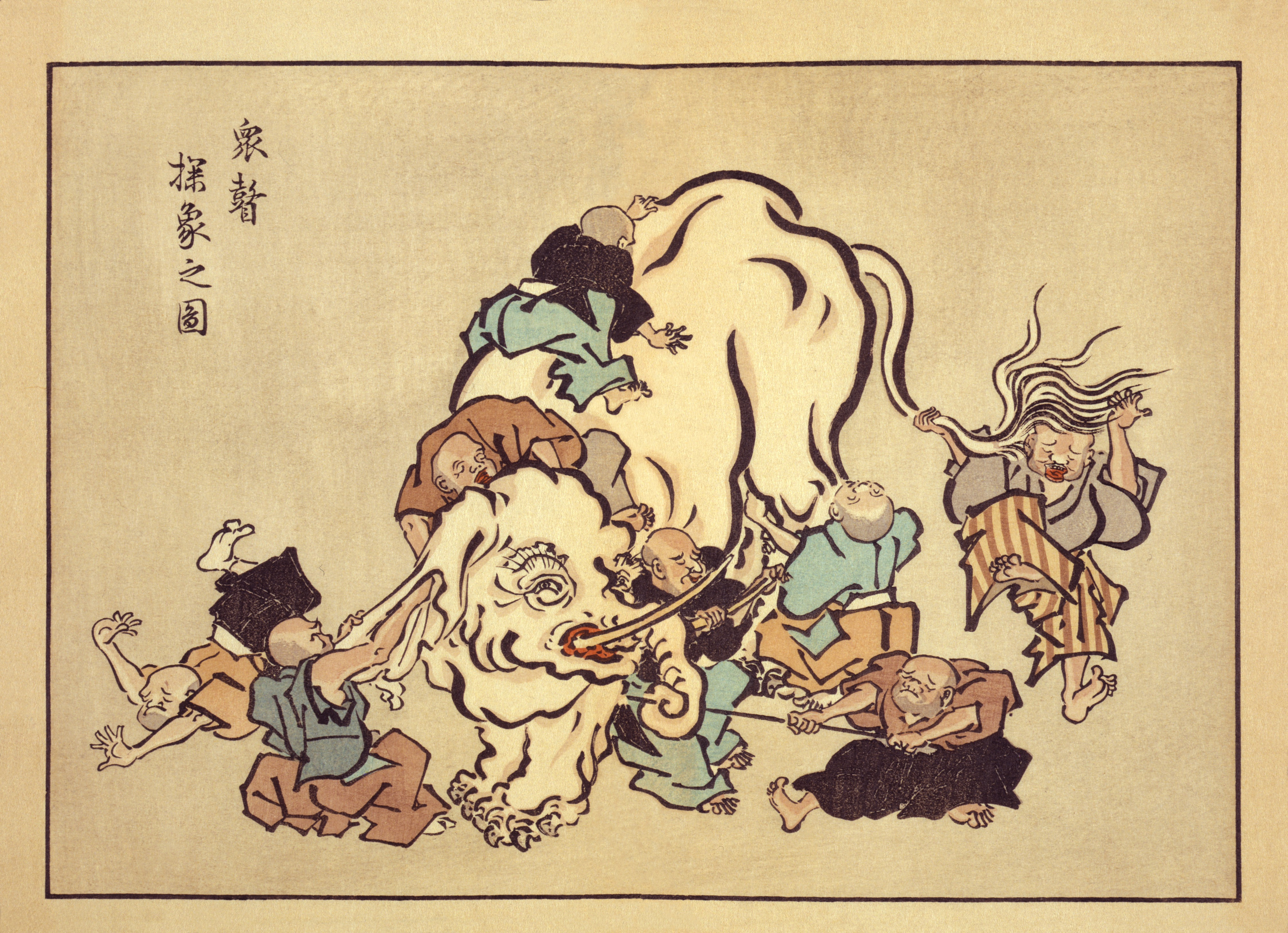
"Blind monks examining an elephant", an ukiyo-e print by Hanabusa Itchō

Hanabusa Itchō (英 一蝶; 1652 – February 7, 1724) was a Japanese painter born in Osaka, calligrapher, and haiku poet. He originally trained in the Kanō style, under Kanō Yasunobu, but ultimately rejected that style and became a literati (bunjin). He was also known as Hishikawa Waō and by a number of other art-names.

== Biography ==
The son of a physician, he was originally named Taga Shinkō. He studied Kanō painting, but soon abandoned the school and his master to form his own style, which would come to be known as the Hanabusa school.

He was exiled in 1698, for parodying one of the shōgun's concubines in painting, to the island of Miyake-jima; he would not return until 1710. That year, in Edo, the artist would formally take the name Hanabusa Itchō.

Most of his paintings depicted typical urban life in Edo, and were approached from the perspective of a literati painter. His style, in-between the Kanō and ukiyo-e, is said to have been "more poetic and less formalistic than the Kanō school, and typical of the "bourgeois" spirit of the Genroku period".

Hanabusa was the master of the later painter Sawaki Suushi. His humorous caricature paintings, depicting parodic scenes drawn from noh, kabuki and Japanese mythology, later influenced the comic print albums produced by the ukiyo-e artist Okumura Masanobu. His school was continued by his successor Hanabusa Ikkei; the gō "Gototei", later used by Utagawa Kunisada, was itself formed by combining the art names of Hanabusa Itchō and Ikkei, with whom Kunisada had studied a new painting style around 1824–1825.

Hanabusa studied poetry under the master Matsuo Bashō, and is said to have been an excellent calligrapher as well. His friends included the poets Matsuo Bashō and Enomoto Kikaku.

His work is held in several institutions worldwide, including the Museum of Fine Arts Boston, the Philadelphia Museum of Art, the Los Angeles County Museum of Art, the Smithsonian Libraries, the Israel Museum , the Suntory Museum of Art, the Seattle Art Museum, the Museum of Cultural History Oslo, the University of Michigan Museum of Art, the Brooklyn Museum, the Minneapolis Institute of Art, the National Museum of Korea, and the British Museum.

== See also ==
- Hanabusa Itchō II – son and pupil of Itchō
- nanga – "literati painting"
