= Charles Madison Curry =

Charles Madison Curry (16 May 1869, in Whiteland, Indiana – 14 March 1944) was an English literature professor and an author and reviewer of children's literature in the late 19th and early 20th century. He was a Professor of English and Literature at Indiana State Normal School (now Indiana State University) and authored the school's Alma Mater in 1925. He edited Literary Readings: An Introduction to the Study of Literature (1903). He created with Martha Adelaide Holton, the Holton-Curry Reader, a basal reader in 8 volumes for the elementary grades, which was published by Rand McNally in 1914.
