= Dharmamudrā =

Dharmamudrā (Sanskrit, Chinese: 法印) is a Buddhist term translated as "the seal of the dharma" or "the distinguishing mark of the dharma". It can be construed as the objective qualities of all phenomena (a related term is the three marks of existence), but is generally interpreted as the "seal" or "mark" that distinguish the Buddhist teachings from non-Buddhist ones. Dharmamudrā also provides doctrinal insight that distinguishes the definitive teachings of Buddhism from the provisional teachings.

== Types of Dharmamudrā ==
One general type is called Trilakṣaṇā dharmamudrā (Sanskrit; Chinese: 三法印), or the three marks:

- Impermanence: All compounded things are characterized by impermanence.
- Non-self: All existing things are characterized by the lack of a self.
- Nirvana: Nirvana is characterized by uncompounded quiescence.

In another typology, the third 'mark' is replaced by "all experiences are characterized by suffering" (Duḥkha).

Another type is called caturmudrā (Sanskrit; Chinese: 四法印), or the four seals, which include "suffering" to the three seals or marks mentioned above.

There is also the five marks or seals, which refer to impermanence, non-self, nirvana, suffering and emptiness.

== See also ==
- Three marks of existence
- Four Dharma Seals
- Anitya
- Anatta
- Nirvana
- Dhukha
- Sunyata
