= Yogācārabhūmi-Śāstra =

Mahayana Buddhist treatise

The Yogācārabhūmi-Śāstra (YBh, Sanskrit; Treatise on the Stage of Yoga Practice) is a large and influential doctrinal compendium, associated with Sanskritic Mahāyāna Buddhism (particularly Yogācāra). According to Ulrich Timme Kragh, it is "a massive treatise that brings together a wealth of material stemming from Mainstream as well as Mahāyāna Buddhism."

== History ==
The Yogācārabhūmi is generally associated with the Indian Yogācāra school because it contains certain unique Yogācāra doctrines, like the eight consciousnesses and the ālaya-vijñāna (storehouse or foundational consciousness). According to Ulrich Timme Kragh, "its overall objective seems to be to present a coherent structure of Buddhist yoga practice with the Mahāyāna path of the bodhisattva placed at the pinnacle of the system", but substantial parts also deal with non-Mahāyāna "mainstream" practices. The text also shows strong affinity to the Abhidharma works of the Mainstream Buddhist Sarvāstivāda school, adopting many of its technical terminology and classifications of phenomena (dharmas).

While it likely contains earlier materials, the YBh is thought to have reached its final redaction in the fourth century CE. Traditional sources name either the Indian thinker Asaṅga (ca. 300–350) or the bodhisattva Maitreya as author, but most modern scholars hold that it is a composite text with different chronological textual layers and various authors, though this does not rule out the possibility that Asaṅga was among them.

According to scholars such as Changhwan Park and Robert Kritzer the YBh may have subtly influenced other North Indian Buddhist works such as the Abhidharmakośa and the works of the Sautrāntika school. The YBh also exherted a strong influence on the later works of the Yogācāra-Vijñānavāda school, such as the Mahāyānasūtrālaṃkāra, the Abhidharma-samuccaya and the Mahāyānasaṃgraha. Finally, the YBh also exherted a clear influence on the tantric tradition of Indian Buddhism of the sixth to fourteenth centuries (and the works of exegetes like Ratnākaraśānti), and the YBh is itself aware of the use of mantras and subjugation rituals that would become common to the tantric tradition.

The YBh was studied and transmitted in East Asian Buddhist and Tibetan Buddhist translations. In China, it was the work of Xuánzàng (玄奘, 602?-664) that introduced the YBh in full. It caused many debates, particularly around the notion that certain beings did not have the gotra, or spiritual disposition, to attain awakening. By the end of the Sui dynasty (589–618), Buddhism within China had developed many distinct schools and traditions. In the words of Dan Lusthaus:

[ Xuanzang ] came to the conclusion that the many disputes and interpretational conflicts permeating Chinese Buddhism were the result of the unavailability of crucial texts in Chinese translation. In particular, he [Xuanzang] thought that a complete version of the Yogācārabhūmi-śāstra (Yuqielun, 瑜伽論), an encyclopedic description of the stages of the Yogācāra path to Buddhahood written by Asaṅga, would resolve all the conflicts. In the sixth century an Indian missionary named Paramārtha (another major translator) had made a partial translation of it. Xuanzang resolved to procure the full text in India and introduce it to China.

The YBh was translated into Tibetan in the ninth century at Samye by Ye shes sde and Cog ro Klu'i rgyal mtshan working with the Indian paṇḍitas Prajñāvarman, Surendrabodhi, and Jinamitra. The YBh remained influential in these traditions (for example, it is a major source of meditation instruction for Tsongkhapa's Lamrimchenmo), however, perhaps because of size and complexity, it was eventually abandoned in monastic seminaries.

Besides the Chinese and Tibetan translations which survive in full, at least 50% of the text survives in nine extant Sanskrit fragments. A translation project is currently underway to translate the entirety of Xuánzàng's version into English. It is being carried out by the Bukkyō Dendō Kyōkai society and the Numata Center for Buddhist Translation and Research. The Bodhisattva-bhūmi, a subsection of the work which is also treated as a stand-alone text, has been translated into English by Artemus Engle and is part of the Tsadra series published by Shambhala Publications.

== Overview of the Main Section ==
The complete YBh is often divided into the Basic Section and the Supplementary Section. The first section, which is the largest (49.9% of the work), is the "main stages division" or "the basic section" (Skt. *Maulyo Bhūmayaḥ, Ch. 本地分 Běn dì fēn, Tib. Sa'i dngos gzhi) and contains fourteen books that describe the successive seventeen levels (bhūmi), which cover the entire range of mental and spiritual stages of practice for the Mahāyāna bodhisattva.

However, according to Ulrich Timme Kragh, "in the present context, the word bhūmi appears in many cases to imply a 'foundation' in the sense of a field of knowledge that the Yogācāra acolyte ought to master in order to be successful in his or her yoga practice." Most of the Basic Section which includes such seminal works as the Bodhisattva-bhūmi and the Śrāvaka-bhūmi survives in Sanskrit, but little survives from the other parts. The following list is based on the Chinese arrangement, which seems to be closer to the original order.

The fourteen books of this section are:

=== 1 - Pañcavijñānakāyasamprayuktā Bhūmiḥ ===
"The Foundation on the Fivefold Group of Empirical Consciousness" provides a phenomenological analysis of the five sensory consciousnesses (the visual, auditory, olfactory, gustatory, and tactile forms of consciousness), in terms of five points, their bases (āśraya), nature (svabhava), foci (alambana), accompanying mental states (sahaya) and functioning (karman). Sense perception is said to have both material basis (the physical sense faculty) and a mental basis (the ālayavijñāna). The mental basis is the latent consciousness which is "the holder of all the seeds [for the mind and mental states]" (sarva-bījaka), "the appropriator of the [corporeal] basis (i.e., the body)" (āśrayopādātṛ), and "belonging to the [category of] karmic maturation" (vipāka-saṃgṛhīta), which refers to the fact that it is morally neutral.

=== 2 - Manobhūmi ===
"The Foundation on Cognition" discusses "thought-consciousness or reflexive consciousness [manas] that arises subsequent to the five sensory perceptions", in terms of the same five points outlined above. It also explains citta, manas, vijñāna, the ālayavijñāna and the afflictive cognition (kliṣṭaṃ manaḥ), using the schema of the eight consciousness. This book also explains the 51 mental factors (caittasikā dharmāḥ), "agreeing with the arrangement that is also seen in the first chapter of Asaṅga's Abhidharmasamuccaya."

An explanation of the functioning or operation (karman) of cognition is also given which includes an extensive overview of death and rebirth, as well as an exposition of Buddhist cosmology and 24 typologies which discuss many modes of existence. The rest of the book discusses various classifications of dharmas (phenomena), the first of which divides phenomena into physical (rūpasamudāya), mental (cittacaitasikakalāpa) and unconditioned (asaṃskṛta). This exposition rejects the Abhidharma theory of atoms (paramāṇu) and instead posits that the seeds (bīja, causal potential) for physical matter are in the mind stream, which suggests that matter emerges from the mental.

The second group of classifications relates to causality and explains time (adhvan), arising (jāti), elapsing (jarā), enduring (sthiti), impermanence (anityatā) and four types of causal conditions (pratyaya). The third group is an ethical classification of phenomena as being either beneficial (kuśala) or not (akuśala) or indeterminate (avyākṛta). The fourth classification includes the twelve constituents of perception (dhātu).

=== 3 - Savitarkasavicārādibhūmi ===
This book discusses three different foundations having to do with vitarka (discernment) and vicara (discursiveness): (1) the foundation which includes both, (2) the foundation with only discursiveness and (3) the foundation that has neither of these.

According to Ulrich Timme Kragh "discernment is said to be the cognitive operation that is responsible for ascertaining what is perceived by the senses by initially labeling it with a name, while discursiveness is explained as being the subsequent conceptual operation of deciding whether the perceived sense-object is desirable and what course of action one might want to take in relation to it." Because these two cognitive factors play a crucial role in samsaric bondage and in meditative concentration (samādhi, which is the pacification of these two factors), they are the focus of an extensive analysis in this book. This analysis is divided into five sections:

- A description of the three realms in saṃsāra: the desire realm (kāmadhātu), the form realm (rūpadhātu) and the realm of incorporeality (ārūpyadhātu).
- A description of the various defining characteristics (lakṣaṇa) of discernment and discursiveness.
- A description of the associated correct observation (yoniśomanaskāra), which is "a mental outlook inclined to practice generosity and uphold a good moral."
- A description of the associated incorrect observation (ayoniśomanaskāra), which consist of "sixteen types of mistaken views and beliefs," such as eternalism, materialism, belief in a Creator God, belief in the caste superiority of brahmins, and belief in animal sacrifice.
- A description of the defilements (saṃkleśa), which are "the emotive and rational states through which sentient beings misperceive reality, e.g., desire, hatred, and ignorance." These are presented as subdivided into different categories, a total of 128 types of defilement are outlined. This section also explains defilement in terms of karma and in terms of the defilement of rebirth and dependent origination (pratītyasamutpāda).

=== 4 - Samāhitā Bhūmiḥ ===
This book is titled "The Foundation on Meditative Immersion" and attempts to provide a coherent and exhaustive presentation of meditation. Large parts of this book make use of the canonical sutras of "conservative Buddhism" (i.e. non-Mahayana). The first section of this book gives a general overview of meditation using four terms: meditation (dhyāna), liberation (vimokṣa), meditative attainment (samāpatti), and samādhi.

The second section of this book provides an extensive presentation of meditation (dhyāna). First, five positive states to be cultivated and five negative states to be abandoned are explained. Then the five hindrances (nivaraṇa) are explained in detail. This is followed by a thorough explanation of each aspect (aṅga) of the four absorptions (catvāri dhyānāni). Also, various related terms from the scriptures are discussed.

The third section provides a classification of the various types of meditation, these types are either divided into different forms of 'observation' (manasikāra) or classified according to the various foci (ālambana) on which one concentrates, which are called the 'images' (nimitta). Forty types of meditative observation are listed and explained in detail in this section.

Meditative images are presented in terms of four aspects: (1) the image as the meditative focus (ālambananimitta), (2) the image as the basis for meditation (nidānanimitta), (3) the images that are to be abandoned (parivarjanīyaṃ nimittaṃ), and (4) the images that are to be relied upon (pratiniṣevaṇīyaṃ nimittaṃ). The images to be abandoned are: dimness (laya), restlessness (auddhatya), distraction (vikṣepa), and attachment (saṅga). A further 32 meditative images are also enumerated in this section, as well as how to enter the four meditative absorptions.

The fourth section is a summary of how meditation is explained in the sutras. The topics of the meditative liberations (vimokṣa) and the various types of samādhi are outlined, such as the emptiness (śūnyatā), wishlessness (apraṇihita), and imagelessness (ānimitta), as well as samādhi with and without vitarka-vicara.

=== 5 - Asamāhitā Bhūmiḥ ===
This book, "The Foundation on Being Without Meditative Absorption", lists 12 states that remain devoid of meditative absorption, such as a mind that is engaged in the realm of sensual desire (kāmāvacara) or the mind of a beginner meditator that suffers from distraction (vikṣepa).

=== 6 - Sacittikā Acittikā Bhūmiḥ ===
This book, "The Foundation on Having Mentation and Being Without Mentation", examines the notion of 'mind' or 'mentation' (citta) in relation to meditation and other doctrines" and discusses different states that are with or without citta. States without citta include the meditative attainment of cessation (nirodhasamāpatti) and nirvāṇa, which is a state in which all mentation ceases, even the latent consciousness (ālayavijñāna).

=== 7 - Śrutamayī Bhūmiḥ ===
"The Foundation on What is Derived from Listening" focuses on various issues dealing with learning, listening to, and memorizing Buddhist spiritual knowledge (adhyātmavidyā). "Listening" is related to processes of "listening to religious discourses, memorizing and reciting scriptures, and recollecting various points of doctrine, all of which result in knowledge of the Buddhist teachings."

The book contains an outline of various basic Buddhist concepts in different sets or groupings similar to Abhidharma lists. This book also contains outlines of other forms of knowledge, such as the arts of healing (cikitsā), logical reasoning (hetuvidyā), and linguistic knowledge (śabdavidyā).

=== 8 - Cintāmayī Bhūmiḥ ===
"The Foundation on What is Derived from Understanding" deals with understanding (cintā) which refers to when "the practitioner based on his or her studies of the teachings arrives at a singular 'view' or philosophical outlook of reality along with knowing the religious path that leads to the eradication of misconceptions of reality and the inner realization of this view."

This presentation is divided into three sections. The first section explains how one internalizes what one has heard or studied. The practitioner is supposed to contemplate and analyze the meaning of what they have learned in solitude. The second section provides an analysis of what is to be known (jñeyapravicaya), which is divided into what exists and what does not exist. What exists is analyzed by various categories, such as their specific characteristics (svalakṣaṇa), general characteristics (sāmānyalakṣaṇa), and causal characteristics (hetulakṣaṇa).

The book also presents a second analysis of "fivefold existence" (astitā) and fivefold non-existence which is more closely connected with the Yogācāra-Vijñānavāda doctrine of the three natures (trisvabhāva) and the three absences of intrinsic nature (triniḥsvabhāvatā). The fivefold existences are:

1. being existent in the sense of the perfectly accomplished character (pariniṣpannalakṣaṇa),
2. being existent in the sense of the dependent character (paratantralakṣaṇa),
3. being existent in the sense of the imagined character (parikalpitalakṣaṇa),
4. being existent in the sense of a specific character (viṣeśalakṣaṇa),
5. being existent as something having an inexpressible character (avaktavyalakṣaṇa).

The corresponding non-existences are:

1. lacking the character of highest reality (paramārthalakṣaṇa),
2. lacking the character of being independent (svatantralakṣaṇa),
3. entirely lacking any character of its own (sarveṇa sarvaṃ svalakṣaṇa),
4. lacking a specific character (aviśeṣalakṣaṇa),
5. lacking an expressible character (vaktavyalakṣaṇa).

The third section of this book, the analysis of the teachings (dharmapravicaya), "consists of three passages of selected canonical and paracanonical verses accompanied by a prose commentary." Among the key topics discussed here are the latent consciousness (ālayavijñāna), and the three kinds of religious training (śikṣā). Many passages from the Udānavarga are quoted, which, according to Schmithausen, shows that the canon used by the compilers of this text belongs to the Mūlasarvāstivāda sect.

=== 9 - Bhāvanāmayī Bhūmiḥ ===
"The Foundation on What is Derived from Meditative Cultivation" discusses meditative cultivation (bhāvanā), in terms of its basis, conditions, the practice of yoga and its results. First, the right circumstances needed to encounter the teachings and practice them are explained, which include being reborn as a suitable sentient being, being born in the right place and so on. Then an explanation of how to listen to the true teaching is given, mainly, one must listen without disdain, distraction or faintheartedness. This leads the practitioner to trust that nirvāṇa is a real and worthy goal and thus they turn their mind towards this as their ultimate aim.

The book then discusses the conditions needed for achieving meditative insight (vipaśyanā) and tranquility (śamatha). The initial necessary circumstance leading to insight is said to be reliance on a spiritual friend (sanmitra) while tranquility is said to require the perfection of discipline (śīlasampatti). The process towards spiritual realization is said to progress through the practice of ethical discipline and associating with a spiritual mentor, these two reinforce each other and lead to the study and internalization of the teachings, which give rise to a sense of renunciation of everything worldly and a yearning for realization. The spiritual seeker then applies all the remedies against the afflictions and achieves complete mental purity.

After the inner and outer causes for spiritual development have been explained, this section then discusses the actual practice of meditative cultivation. This is explained through a list of ten types of remedies or antidotes (pratipakṣa) applied to counter the numerous afflictions and adverse inclinations (vipakṣa) that are also explained here. The ten meditative antidotes are:

1. contemplating (of the notion) of unattractiveness (aśubhasaṃjnā),
2. contemplating impermanence (anityasaṃjnā),
3. contemplating the suffering found in what is impermanent (anitye duḥkhasaṃjñā),
4. contemplating selflessness with regard to what entails suffering (duḥkhe 'anātmasaṃjñā),
5. fostering an attitude of indifference to food (āhāre pratikūlasaṃjñā),
6. fostering an attitude of disinterest in anything worldly (sarvaloke anabhiratisaṃjñā),
7. meditating on images of light (ālokasaṃjñā),
8. fostering an attitude of detachment (virāgasaṃjñā),
9. contemplating cessation (nirodhasaṃjñā),
10. contemplating death (maraṇasaṃjñā).

Following this presentation, the book discusses practical advice related to the attainment of meditative immersion (samādhilābha), covering topics such as living with others, finding and learning from a teacher, material affairs, one's environment, sleep and eating patterns, practicing asceticism, etc.

Then, the fulfillment of meditative immersion (samādhiparipūri) is discussed, which refers to the process in which a meditator goes deeper into samadhi and achieves mastery of meditation, experiencing five stages of fruition.

=== 10 - Śrāvakabhūmi ===
"The Foundation on the Hearer". This book focuses on practices associated with "hearers" or "disciples" (śrāvaka). Lambert Schmithausen, Noritoshi Aramaki, Florin Deleanu and Alex Wayman all hold that this is the oldest layer of the YBh.

The Śrāvakabhūmi is divided into four sections called yogasthānas (yogic foundations or topics) and is the second largest book of the YBh.

==== Yogasthāna 1 ====
The first subdivision of the first yogasthāna is called the Gotrabhūmi, and it discusses, in depth, how different practitioners have different spiritual dispositions (gotra), which is explained as a mental potential or capacity, which is like a seed (bīja-dharma) for spiritual achievement, found in the person since beginningless time. This predisposition is at first hidden, but if a person encounters the right causes and conditions, they will reach nirvāṇa. This section also discusses the qualities of persons that are "not predisposed" for awakening, which are persons that lack the qualities needed to attain nirvāṇa. The different types of predisposed persons are also discussed.

The second subdivision is called the Avatārabhūmi and it focuses on how different types of persons enter (avatāra) into the path as well as the characteristics of these different types of persons that have entered the path (avatīrṇāḥ pudgalāḥ).

The third foundation of the first yogasthāna is "The Foundation of Going Forth" (naiṣkramyabhūmi). Going forth is a term which implies the abandonment of the household life and becoming a monastic but can also generally refer to entering the spiritual life. This foundation could technically be seen as covering the rest of the entire Śrāvakabhūmi and covers the entire path of practice. The path is divided into two branches, the mundane (laukikaḥ mārgaḥ) and supramundane (lokottaraḥ mārgaḥ).

In following the mundane path, practitioners realize that the realm of sense desire is brutish and coarse and see that the absorption and rapture of the first dhyāna is superior and serene. In practicing this dhyāna, they achieve detachment from sense desire. They then realize that this meditation is also coarse, and progress to the second dhyāna, and so on until they reach the fourth dhyāna and beyond into the four immaterial attainments. The supramundane path meanwhile entails finding a genuine teacher, gaining knowledge of Dharma and realizing the four noble truths for oneself through vipaśyanā meditation they completely transcend saṃsāra.

The rest of this text discusses the 13 requisites (sambhāra) needed for journeying along these paths:

1. The first requisite is a human rebirth in a place and condition that is opportune for practicing the Dharma,
2. The second is the fact that a Buddha has appeared in the world, has taught the Dharma, and that this has been successfully transmitted down to the present
3. The third is to have a beneficial aspiration for [practicing] the Dharma (kuśalo dharmacchanda).
4. The fourth requisite is the restraint of discipline (śīlasaṃvara), which refers to keeping the ethical prātimokṣa rules.
5. The fifth requisite is sense restraint (indriya-saṃvara) which means to "keep the doors of the senses guarded, maintaining a protective awareness (ārakṣitasmṛti)" and "a constantly watchful awareness (nipakasmṛti)." This practice requires that one carefully observes the process of sense perception to avoid adopting confused or harmful thinking that leads to the defilements, such as thinking that what is unattractive is attractive.
6. The sixth requisite is the right amount of food intake (bhojane mātra-jñatā). It is eating with careful consideration, only for the sake of a healthy body, not pleasure, company or bodily beauty.
7. The seventh requisite is to practice staying awake (jāgarikāyoga) in the evening (first part of the night after sunset) and in the early morning (last part of the night before sunrise). This is accomplished by taking a walk and through the visualization of a mass of light.
8. The eighth requisite is to move about attentively (saṃprajānadvihāritā) during all of one's daily activities and in all postures.
9. The ninth requisite is to find a proper spiritual teacher (kalyāṇamitra), the right qualities of a good teacher are then outlined, including pure discipline, knowing much, being compassionate, etc.
10. The tenth requisite "is to listen to the true Dharma and understand it (saddharmaśravaṇacintanā)". This section explains the twelve branches of the Buddha's Dharma and the threefold division of Sutra, Vinaya and Abhidharma.
11. The eleventh requisite is to be free from obstacles (anantarāya). This section outlines the many different kinds of obstacles that block one's practice.
12. The twelfth requisite is 'relinquishment' (tyāga), defined as "giving items that are beyond reproach as gifts."
13. The thirteenth requisite is to possess "the ornaments of a renunciant" (śramaṇālaṃkāra), which is a list of seventeen qualities including: faith (śrāddha), honesty (aśatha), intelligence (prājña), asceticism, and patience (kṣama).

==== Yogasthāna 2 ====
The second section discusses 28 different personality types and also various ways of classifying spiritual practitioners. An example of one such classification is that of persons of different temperaments (caritaprabheda). These are: the temperament of desire and attachment (rāgacaritaḥ), the temperament of dislike and hatred (dveṣacaritaḥ), the temperament of deludedness and stupidity (mohacaritaḥ), the temperament of pride and self-conceit (mānacarita), the temperament of intellectuality (vitarkacarita), and the temperament with equal amounts [of each afflictive state] (samabhāgacarita).

Following this exposition, the various meditative foci (ālambana) are explained. It is in this section that concrete meditation techniques appear in this treatise. These meditations are divided into four kinds: (I) general [types of] foci, (II) foci purifying the practitioner's temperament, (III) foci [for developing] expertise, and (IV) foci purifying the afflictions.

There are four types of general foci (vyāpyālambanam):

1. The conceptual image (savikalpaṃ pratibimbam), used in insight meditation (vipaśyanā). A meditator chooses a doctrinal topic such as the four noble truths, dependent arising, or the aggregrates and analyzes it conceptually while resting in meditation until a realization emerges.
2. The non-conceptual image (nirvikalpaṃ pratibimbam) used in tranquility meditation (śamatha). The mind is brought to rest on the object without analysis in nine steps called "the nine aspects of resting the mind" (navākārā cittasthitiḥ).
3. The entirety of things (vastuparyantatā). This is to concentrate on the five aggregates (skandha), the eighteen constituents of perception (dhātu), or the twelve perceptual domains (āyatana) concerning their causality, function, or characteristics.
4. The fourth type of general foci is the perfection of the aim [of meditation] (kāryapariniṣpatti), where the meditative image is transcended, one reaches the dhyanas and attains the vision of non-conceptual, direct knowledge (nirvikalpam pratyakṣaṃ jñāna-darśanam).

Regarding the non-conceptual image, śamatha practice is said to progress through nine "mental abidings" (S. navākārā cittasthiti, Tib. sems gnas dgu), leading to the state of śamatha proper, and from there to a state of meditative concentration called the first dhyāna (Pāli: jhāna; Tib. bsam gtan) which is often said to be a state of tranquillity or bliss. The Nine Mental Abidings are:

1. Placement of the mind (S. cittasthāpana, Tib. འཇོག་པ - sems ’jog-pa) occurs when the practitioner is able to place their attention on the object of meditation, but is unable to maintain that attention for very long. Distractions, dullness of mind and other hindrances are common.
2. Continuous placement (S. samsthāpana, Tib. རྒྱུན་དུ་འཇོག་པ - rgyun-du ‘jog-pa) occurs when the practitioner experiences moments of continuous attention on the object before becoming distracted. According to B. Alan Wallace, this is when you can maintain your attention on the meditation object for about a minute.
3. Repeated placement (S. avasthāpana, Tib. བླན་ཏེ་འཇོག་པ - slan-te ’jog-pa) is when the practitioner's attention is fixed on the object for most of the practice session and she or he is able to immediately realize when she or he has lost their mental hold on the object and is able to restore that attention quickly. Sakyong Mipham Rinpoche suggests that being able to maintain attention for 108 breaths is a good benchmark for when we have reached this stage.
4. Close placement (S. upasthāpana, Tib. ཉེ་བར་འཇོག་པ - nye-bar ’jog-pa) occurs when the practitioner is able to maintain attention throughout the entire meditation session (an hour or more) without losing their mental hold on the meditation object at all. In this stage the practitioner achieves the power of mindfulness. Nevertheless, this stage still contains subtle forms of excitation and dullness or laxity.
5. Taming (S. damana, Tib. དུལ་བར་བྱེད་པ - dul-bar byed-pa), by this stage the practitioner achieves deep tranquility of mind, but must be watchful for subtle forms of laxity or dullness, peaceful states of mind which can be confused for calm abiding. By focusing on the future benefits of gaining Shamatha, the practitioner can uplift (gzengs-bstod) their mind and become more focused and clear.
6. Pacifying (S. śamana, Tib. ཞི་བར་བྱེད་པ་ - zhi-bar byed-pa) is the stage during which subtle mental dullness or laxity is no longer a great difficulty, but now the practitioner is prone to subtle excitements which arise at the periphery of meditative attention. According to B. Alan Wallace this stage is achieved only after thousands of hours of rigorous training.
7. Fully pacifying (S. vyupaśamana, Tib. རྣམ་པར་ཞི་བར་བྱེད་པ་ - nye-bar zhi-bar byed-pa), although the practitioner may still experience subtle excitement or dullness, they are rare and the practitioner can easily recognize and pacify them.
8. Single-pointing (S. ekotīkarana, Tib. རྩེ་གཅིག་ཏུ་བྱེད་པ་ - rtse-gcig-tu byed-pa) in this stage the practitioner can reach high levels of concentration with only a slight effort and without being interrupted even by subtle laxity or excitement during the entire meditation session.
9. Balanced placement (S. samādhāna, Tib. མཉམ་པར་འཇོག་པ་བྱེད་པ་ - mnyam-par ’jog-pa) the meditator now effortlessly reaches absorbed concentration (ting-nge-‘dzin, S. samadhi.) and can maintain it for about four hours without any single interruption.
10. Śamatha, Tib. ཞི་གནས་, shyiné - the culmination, is sometimes listed as a tenth stage.

The foci for purifying the practitioner's temperament (caritaviśodhanam ālambanam) contains extensive explanations of five contemplative objects:

- The person with a temperament of desire is assigned various meditations on unattractiveness (aśubhā) and charnel ground contemplation (maraṇasati). This section also teaches meditation on the unattractiveness of the mental afflictions and on the unattractiveness of the impermanence of the five aggregates.
- The person with a temperament of dislike and hatred is assigned the meditation on friendliness (maitrī). The meditation consists of wishing happiness for one's friends, enemies and neutral persons until one is able to rest in an expansive and unlimited absorption state that wishes well for all. This method is then applies to meditation on compassion (karuṇā) and sympathetic rejoicing (muditā).
- The person with a temperament of deludedness and stupidity is assigned the meditation on causality and dependent arising (idaṃpratyayatāpratītya-samutpāda).
- The person with a temperament of pride and conceit is assigned the meditation on the division of the constituents (dhātuprabheda), i.e. the six elements of earth, water, fire, air, space, and consciousness.
- The person with an intellectual temperament is assigned the various meditations on breathing mindfulness (ānāpānasmṛti). Five different techniques are presented: (1) counting the breath, (2) observing how each of the five aggregates is involved in the breathing process, (3) observing dependent arising through the breath, (4) observing the four noble truths, (5) the exercise of the sixteen aspects (ṣoḍaśākāra-paricaya) of ānāpānasmṛti.

The third type of foci, which are also termed the foci [for developing] expertise (kauśalyālambana), refers to the following:

- Expertise in the aggregates (skandhakauśalya), is cultivated by contemplating the distinct nature of each aggregate and understanding none of them as a permanent, unchanging phenomenon.
- Expertise in the constituents [of perception] (dhātukauśalya), is cultivated by observing how each dhātu "arises, unfolds, and becomes cognizant."
- Expertise in the domains [of perception] (āyatana-kauśalya), is cultivated by contemplating how the different conditions in each domain give rise to each type of consciousness.
- Expertise in dependent arising (pratītyasamutpādakauśalya) is cultivated as follows: "the meditator first analyzes how each link serves as a condition for the subsequent link to arise and then understands that the causality involved in this process requires each phenomenon to be impermanent. Since they are impermanent, they also involve suffering and are without any self."
- Expertise in what constitutes a basis and what does not constitute a basis [for beneficial action and desirable karmic results] (sthānāsthānakauśalya) is cultivated by meditating on how negative and beneficial actions have different kinds of karmic results.

The fourth meditative object is the foci purifying the afflictions (kleśaviśodhanaṃ ālambanam). This is related to the mundane and supramundane paths. In the mundane path, meditation focuses on seeing the realm of existence one is currently on (e.g. realm of desire) as coarse, while the realm which is immediately above (i.e. first dhyana) is seen as peaceful. Then once one has attained the higher realm in meditation, one continues this process (i.e. one sees the first dhyana as coarse and the second dhyana as peaceful and so on). On the supramundane path, the foci for meditation are the four noble truths.

After these presentations, there follows an exposition on how to give instructions to a student, and another section on the three trainings (superior discipline, superior meditative mind and superior insight). Then there follows a segment which outlines "ten factors that go along with the training (śikṣānulomikā dharmāḥ), which are remedies to ten factors that go against the dharma. These are:

1. the contemplation of unattractiveness (aśubhasaṃjñā) counters sexual attachment,
2. the contemplation of impermanence (anityasaṃjñā) remedies belief in a self,
3. the contemplation of suffering with regard to what is impermanent (anitye duḥkhasaṃjñā) overcomes laziness and apathy,
4. the contemplation of no-self in suffering (duḥkhe 'nātmasaṃjñā) opposes belief in a self,
5. the contemplation of the un-attractiveness of food (āhāre pratikūlasaṃjñā) counters desire for eating,
6. the contemplation of the lack of real happiness anywhere in the world (sarvaloke 'nabhiratisaṃjñā) works against craving for listening to chatter about the world,
7. the visualization of light (ālokasaṃjñā) remedies states that cloud or confuse the mind, such as doubt, unclarity, tiredness, sleepiness, and so forth,
8. the contemplation of non-attachment (virāgasaṃjñā) works against attachment to the bliss experienced in higher states of meditation,
9. the contemplation of cessation (nirodhasaṃjñā) overcomes desire for the meditative absorption,
10. the contemplation of death (maraṇasaṃjñā) remedies the misery that arises from wishing and hoping for life.

The second Yogasthāna also gives a general definition of yoga as "spiritual practice", which is said to have four aspects, (1) faith (śraddhā), (2) aspiration (chandas), (3) perseverance (vīrya), and (4) spiritual methods (upāya).

Another segment of the second Yogasthāna explains four levels of mental observation, engagement or attention (manaskāra) as it relates to the strength and constancy of one's mental focus on the object of meditation. These four levels are:

1. forceful application [of the mind towards the meditative object] (balavāhana),
2. interrupted application (sacchidravāhana),
3. uninterrupted application (niśchidravāhana),
4. effortless application (anābhogavāhana).

Other topics are also outlined in the second Yogasthāna, including the nine types of ascertainment (adhimokṣa) of the meditative focus, the four aims of yoga (yoga-karaṇīya), the different kinds of yoga practitioners (yogācāra), the cultivation of notions (saṃjñā-bhāvanā), the thirty-seven factors of Awakening (saptatriṃśad bodhipakṣyā dharmāḥ) and the four stages of contemplative fruition (bhāvanāphala).

==== Yogasthāna 3 ====
The third section discusses various practical issues on the path, how one approaches a teacher and how a teacher assesses a student's abilities and predispositions. Then five topics which a teacher instructions their student are discussed:

1. How to guard and accumulate the requisites needed for meditation (samādhisaṃbhārarakṣopacaya).
2. How to practice in solitary retreat (prāvivekya). The best location is in the wilderness, but it should also be safe and it should be easy to obtain provisions. The ideal retreat is done in solitude.
3. How to achieve one-pointedness of mind (cittai-kāgratā). Samadhi is defined in this section as "a stream of mind characterized by continuous irreproachable bliss whose focus is an appropriate object of constant mindfulness." This section also discusses the practice of tranquility (śamatha) and meditative insight (vipaśyanā). Tranquility is discussed through "the nine aspects of resting the mind" (navākārā cittasthitiḥ) and the four levels of mental observation. Vipaśyanā is explained through "four supports" for insight and "three gates".
4. How to purify the hindrances (āvaraṇaviśuddhi). This is done by (1) recognizing the nature (svabhāva) of the hindrances, (2) knowing the circumstances (nidāna) under which they arise, (3) realizing the drawbacks (ādīnava) that they cause, and (4) employing the right remedies (pratipakṣa).
5. How to cultivate meditative observation (manaskārabhāvanā), four progressive stages are outlined. The first is "the observation that toughens the mind", which leads to disenchantment with saṃsāra. Then one practices "the observation that moistens the mind" through recollecting the qualities of the three jewels. Thirdly, one practices the observation that produces inner comfort, relaxation, and ease (praśrabdhi-janako) through resting in śamatha and vipaśyanā meditation. Finally, one reaches "the observation that perfects knowledge and the view...by first perfecting the practice of śamatha and thereupon repeatedly penetrating into the nature of phenomena with the insight of vipaśyanā." The goal of this is a mind that "has become one-pointed, gentle, and peaceful, and the various types of negative temperaments no longer arise in the circumstances where they typically would be felt."

==== Yogasthāna 4 ====
The fourth section discusses the mundane and supramundane paths in detail. The mundane path deals with abandoning the sensual realm and practicing the meditative absorptions (dhyānas), which lead to rebirth in higher realms (but does not lead to awakening). The various meditative observations that lead to the practice of the dhyānas is taught in this section, and the characteristics of the eight dhyānas are analyzed in detail.

Other meditative attainments are also discussed, such as the meditative attainment of non-ideation (asaṃjñisamāpatti) and the meditative attainment of cessation (nirodhasamāpatti). The results of these practices are also presented, including the five types of extrasensory knowledge (pañcābhijñā), and rebirth in the realm of non-sensual corporeality (rūpadhātu) and the realm of incorporeality (ārūpyadhātu).

Turning to the supramundane path (lokottaraḥ mārgaḥ), practicing this path requires fully understanding the four noble truths and its sixteen characteristics through meditative observation. These sixteen characteristics are explained in detail, they are:

- The four characteristics of the truth of suffering are impermanence (anityākāra), suffering (duḥkhākāra), emptiness (*śūnyākāra), and selflessness (anātmākāra).
- The four characteristics of the origin of suffering are cause (hetu), origination (samudaya), production (prabhava), and condition (pratyaya).
- The characteristics the end of suffering are cessation (nirodha), peace (śānta), excellence (praṇīta), and escape (niḥsaraṇa).
- The characteristics of the path to the end of suffering are being the path (mārga), the method (nyāya), the practice (pratipatti), and what leads out [of suffering] (nairyāṇika).

This path leads to nirvana as an arhat, through the ultimate meditation that gains insight into the four noble truths, called the vajra-like meditation (vajropamaḥ samādhi).

=== 11 - Pratyekabuddhabhūmi ===
This short section titled "The Foundation on the Solitary Buddha" outlines the disposition, path and practices of the pratyekabuddha. Kragh notes that "the pratyekabuddha avoids crowds and takes pleasure in solitude, exhibits little compassion and is not inclined to teach others, and is of mediocre aptitude and has a temperament of pride."

=== 12 - Bodhisattvabhūmi ===
The Foundation on the Mahāyāna Bodhisattva, which is the longest book in the basic section, is divided into three yogasthānas and ten topics:

1. the basis for being a bodhisattva (ādhāra)
2. the characteristics of a bodhisattva (liṅga)
3. the classes of bodhisattvas (pakṣa)
4. the bodhisattva's exalted conviction (adhyāśaya)
5. the dwellings of a bodhisattva's practice (vihāra)
6. the bodhisattva's rebirths (upapatti)
7. how bodhisattvas lead sentient beings to perfection (parigraha)
8. the spiritual levels (bhūmi)
9. the bodhisattva's practices (caryā)
10. the ascension to Buddhahood (pratiṣṭhā)

==== Yogasthāna 1 ====
Yogasthāna one is titled the section on the basis (ādhārayogasthāna) because it deals with the basis (ādhāra) for becoming a bodhisattva (topic 1). There are three main aspects of the basis of a bodhisattva. The first is an inborn unique predisposition (svagotra) for the bodhisattva path, those who lack this are said to be unable to reach Buddhahood. The second is "the basis of initially engendering the resolve to reach Buddhahood (prathamaś cittotpādaḥ), which refers to arousing bodhicitta, practicing the perfections for the benefit of oneself and others, and so forth. The third is "the basis of practicing all the factors leading to Awakening" (sarve bodhipakṣyā dharmāḥ).

Those who will become Buddhas are said to have a particular 'original nature' (prakṛti), which is like a 'seed' (bīja) that predisposes them to this path. This nature is accomplished through the cultivation of good qualities. These persons are seen as "vastly superior to śrāvakas, pratyekabuddhas, and all ordinary sentient beings" because they have the ability to remove cognitive hindrances (jñeyāvaraṇa) and afflictive hindrances (kleśāvaraṇa), while other beings are only able to remove afflictive hindrance. Also, bodhisattvas practice for the good and well-being of all sentient beings, while practitioners of other paths only practice for their own good. These persons are generally caring, compassionate, harmless, helpful, love solitude and have a natural capacity for understanding the Buddhadharma.

The bodhisattva's resolve to attain Buddhahood is described in detail. Its conditions, causes, aspects, qualities and so forth are outlined. The book explains how a bodhisattva engenders this wish and how they must practice, which is divided into seven undertakings.

1. Training for their own benefit
2. Training for the benefit of others, which must be balanced with the first undertaking.
3. Training in realizing the nature of reality (tattvārtha), which in an ultimate sense refers to the insubstantiality of phenomena (dharmanairātmya) and that all phenomena are without the duality (advaya) of existence (bhāva) and non-existence (abhāva).
4. Developing five types of spiritual power (prabhāva) such as different forms of clairvoyance (abhijñāprabhāva), and the power of the six perfections.
5. Developing sentient beings, which depends on their innate dispositions for different paths and so on.
6. Developing the qualities of a Buddha in themselves
7. Highest and complete Awakening (anuttarā samyaksaṃbodhiḥ), which is only achieved through the removal of the afflictive hindrances and the cognitive hindrances.

Yogasthāna one also expounds on the six perfections (ṣaṭpāramitā) at length, they are:

- The perfection of generosity (dānapāramitā). Dāna's nature is that "the bodhisattva gives to others whatever they need" without attachment, self-interest or partiality. This includes material things and the bodhisattva's own body as well as teaching Dharma, but not weapons or things that cause harm.
- The perfection of discipline (śīlapāramitā). One practices ethical discipline (śīla) by receiving, keeping and restoring ethical vows (saṃvara) properly. This includes both vows for householders and monastics. It also includes doing all kinds of beneficial actions such as studying the Dharma, teaching others, caring for the sick, giving material goods, praising the good qualities of others, protecting others from danger, and leading others away from negative actions. The procedure for taking the bodhisattva vow is explained as well as the various transgressions of this vow. The four major transgressions are: (1) to belittle others and exalt oneself in hope of gain, (2) to refuse to help suffering beings by not giving alms or not sharing the Dharma (to those who ask for it), (3) to harm others and hold a grudge against others, (4) to disparage the bodhisattva teachings.
- The perfection of endurance (kṣāntipāramitā). Kṣānti refers to patience, endurance and forbearance. Kragh states that this "must be done with an attitude free from any hope of reward, must be purely motivated by compassion, and must fully forgive the wrongdoing in its entirety." There are three main modes of endurance: (1) patiently bearing wrongdoings inflicted by others, (2) accepting suffering (hardships and distress), and (3) the endurance of resolving to comprehend the Dharma through patient perseverance. A bodhisattva does this through different means, such as reflecting that suffering is caused by past karma, contemplating how people who harm us now may have been our relatives in a past life, and he contemplation of impermanence.
- The perfection of drive or enthusiasm (vīryapāramitā). Vīrya is a strong mental energy or force which aims at gathering good qualities and doing good activities. There are three types: (1) the armor-like drive (which willingly accepts working to help others for eons on end), (2) the drive for gathering good qualities (i.e. practicing the paramitas), and (3) the drive devoted to acting for the benefit of sentient beings (by performing beneficial actions).
- The perfection of meditation (dhyānapāramitā). Dhyāna refers to resting the mind (cittasthiti) so there is one-pointedness of mind (cittaikāgrya). This may refer to śamatha or vipaśyanā, or to a union of the two. It may be done for the sake of happiness in this life, for the sake of gaining the bodhisattva qualities (special samādhis unknown to other paths) and for the sake of helping other sentient beings.
- The perfection of wisdom (prajñāpāramitā). This refers to mastering the five fields of knowledge, which include mundane knowledge as well as ultimate spiritual knowledge (of both the śrāvaka and bodhisattva baskets) such as the four noble truths, cause and effect, etc.

Following the exposition of the perfections, further sections teach various topics such as how to gather students (through giving, affectionate speech, meaningful activity and having a common aim), how to revere the three jewels (through various forms of puja), how to serve and rely on a qualified spiritual teacher (kalyāṇamitra, "good friend") and how to cultivate the four immeasurables (apramāṇa).

Important qualities of a spiritual teacher include: being disciplined and pure in conduct, intelligent and well-educated in the doctrine, experienced and realized in meditation, compassionate, patient and caring, being without attachments and having few wants and needs, skilled at giving clear teachings, and being impartial in teaching others.

Regarding practicing the four immeasurables (apramāṇa), this section states that this can be done in three main ways: by focusing on sentient beings, by focusing on the phenomena (dharmās) which make up sentient beings or completely without focus or reference (anālambanāni). This section also discusses the special kind of compassion that a bodhisattva cultivates, namely great compassion (mahākaruṇā). This kind of compassion is directed towards the suffering of all beings and is cultivated for hundreds of thousands of aeons. A bodhisattva with great compassion would do anything to help sentient beings, such as give up their life in hundreds of rebirths, and endure any torment. The cultivation of the four immeasurables "is said to lead to instant happiness in this life, vast accumulation of merit, development of a firm wish to reach Awakening, and ability to carry the sufferings of others."

The following chapters contain an exposition of all the factors leading to Awakening, the third main aspect of the basis for becoming a bodhisattva. This covers sixteen elements of a bodhisattvas training:

1. To have conscience and a sense of embarrassment (hrīvyapatrāpya), an inner sense of right and wrong.
2. To develop a firm strength (dhṛtibalādhānatā), a steadiness on the path which can control the deluded mind. It is developed by enduring suffering, recognizing negative behaviors and study.
3. To develop tirelessness (akhedatā) in all beneficial undertakings through training in insight and compassion.
4. To gain knowledge in the various fields of learning
5. To know the world (lokajñatā), which is to see how saṃsāra is an endless and insecure cycle of birth and death, and constantly changing circumstances.
6. To lean on the four reliances (catvāri pratisaraṇāni). These are (1) to rely on the meaning and not on the words, (2) to rely on logic and not on the person giving the teaching, (3) to rely on scriptures of definitive meaning and not on scriptures of provisional meaning (4) when in doubt to rely on the essential understanding one has achieved oneself and not merely on knowledge one has heard from others.
7. Mastering the four analytical knowledges (of the Dharma, meaning, derivative analysis, rhetoric).
8. Gathering the requisites for Awakening (bodhisaṃbhāra), the requisite of merit (puṇyasaṃbhāra) and the requisite of knowledge (jñānasaṃbhāra).
9. To practice the thirty-seven factors of Awakening (saptatriṃśad bodhipakṣyā dharmāḥ), but not to actualize them (na caināṃ sākṣātkaroti).
10. To practice calming meditation (śamatha). According to Timme Kragh, "the practice is essentially the same as that taught in the śrāvaka path but the bodhisattvaengages in these in a special way bringing in a Mahāyāna Prajñāpāramitā understanding."
11. The bodhisattva's practice of insight meditation (vipaśyanā), which is focused on the ultimate level of the thirty-seven factors of Awakening and is preceded by calming meditation.
12. The bodhisattva's expertise in the methods (upāyakau-śalya).
13. The bodhisattva's mastery of retentiveness (dhāraṇī), which refers to the power of memory/remembering teachings as well as the power of mantras and formulas.
14. To engender bodhisattva-aspirations (bodhisattva-praṇidhāna).
15. To accomplish three meditative absorptions (samādhi): emptiness (śūnyatāsamādhi), wishlessness (apraṇihitaḥ samādhiḥ), and imagelessness (ānimittaḥ samādhiḥ).
16. The teaching of the four summary statements (catvārimāni dharmoddānāni): (1) everything conditioned is impermanent (anityāḥ sarvasaṃskārāḥ), (2) everything conditioned is suffering (duḥkhāḥ sarvasaṃskārāḥ), (3) all phenomena are without a [permanent] self (anātmānaḥ sarvadharmāḥ), and (4) nirvāṇa is peace (śāṃtaṃ nirvāṇam).

The last section of Yogasthāna one contains four lists of qualities that advanced bodhisattvas have.

==== Yogasthāna 2 ====
Yogasthāna two (titled "the section on the subsidiary factors ensuing from the basis" ādhārānudharmayogasthāna) explains the characteristics (liṅga) of bodhisattvas (mainly: compassion, affectionate speech, courage, openhandedness, and the ability to unravel deep underlying meanings).

Furthermore, the classes (pakṣa) of bodhisattvas are explained (lay and monastic) along with their four main Dharmas or practices: good deeds, skillfulness and expertise (kauśalya), caring for others (parānugrāha) and dedicatory transfer of merit (pariṇāmanā). The monastic bodhisattvas are said to be superior.

The exalted conviction (adhyāśaya) of a bodhisattva is then explained, which refers to their pure motivation and mindset. A bodhisattva is said to have tenderness towards sentient beings, they are also said to have conviction in the Buddha's teachings derived from faith and analysis. Different forms of conviction are then outlined.

Yogasthāna two also sets out thirteen levels or dwellings (vihāra) of accomplishment in the practice of a bodhisattva. This framework of the bodhisattva's path to awakening is as follows:

1. The abode of the predisposition (gotravihāra). This refers to someone with the predisposition for being a bodhisattva who has not given rise to the resolve for awakening.
2. The abode of practicing with ascertainment (adhimukticaryā-vihāra). This is when a bodhisattva has given rise to the resolve for Awakening and begins to practice, but they have an impure conviction and unstable meditation.
3. The abode of joy (pramuditavihāra). This is when a bodhisattva has pure conviction due to having their first glimpse of direct realization. Their meditation is now vast, uninterrupted, and certain.
4. The abode higher discipline (adhiśīlavihāra) is when discipline is cultivated on the basis of pure conviction.
5. The abode of higher mind (adhicittavihāra) is when one practices all stages of mundane meditation on the basis of higher discipline.
6. The abode of higher insight associated with the factors of Awakening (bodhipakṣyapratisaṃyukto 'dhiprajñavihāra) is the level of analyzing the thirty-seven factors of Awakening in order to realize the truths, beginning with the four foundations of mindfulness.
7. The abode of higher insight associated with the truths (satyapratisaṃyukto 'dhiprajñavihāra) is the level of fully realizing the truths as they are on the basis of having analyzed the factors of Awakening.
8. The abode of higher insight associated with the arising and ceasing of dependent arising (pratītyasamutpādapravṛttinivṛttipratisaṃyukto 'dhiprajñavihāra) is the level wherein the practitioner after having mastered the truths sees how suffering arises when the existential facts are not understood and how suffering comes to an end when the existential facts are understood (through the process of dependent origination).
9. The abode free from conceptual characteristics where the path is steadily followed intentionally and with effort (sābhisaṃskāraḥ sābhogo niśchidra-mārgavāhano nirnimitto vihāraḥ). One constantly cultivates non-conceptual insight into the reality of all phenomena, while applying intention and effort.
10. The abode free from conceptual characteristics where the path is automatically followed spontaneously and effortlessly (anabhisaṃskāro 'anābhoga-mārgavāhano nirnimitta eva vihāraḥ). On this level, the bodhisattva is able to walk the path spontaneously and effortlessly.
11. The abode of analytical knowledge (pratisaṃvidvihāra) is when the bodhisattva uses their mastery of insight and meditation to teach the Dharma to others using all terms, their meanings, their derivative analyses, and subdivisions.
12. The highest and perfected bodhisattva abode (paramaḥ pariniṣ-panno bodhisattvavihāraḥ) is the culmination of the path, where the highest and complete Awakening is achieved. This life is their final rebirth or their penultimate rebirth before entering nirvāṇa.
13. The abode of a Tathāgata (tathāgato vihāraḥ) is when a bodhisattva becomes a buddha, and performs all the various deeds of a buddha.

==== Yogasthāna 3 ====
Yogasthāna three ("the section on the culmination of the basis", ādhāraniṣṭhāyogasthāna) explains general topics six through ten.

Topic six, is the five kinds of rebirths (upapatti) a bodhisattva undergoes during their journey, which are:

1. Rebirth pacifying harm (itiśaṃśamanī upapattiḥ). A bodhisattva is reborn in a difficult time (famine, plague, etc.) in order to help others during this time.
2. Rebirth assuming a corresponding form (tat-sabhāgānuvartinī upapatti). A bodhisattva is reborn among beings who harm others, such as animals, gods, demons, or heretics, and leads them to a good path.
3. Rebirth into greatness (mahattvopapatti). A bodhisattva is born into excellent circumstances and becomes a great person who spiritually benefits others.
4. Rebirth with authority (ādhipatyopapatti). A bodhisattva is born into a position of rulership over the world or the gods.
5. The bodhisattva's final rebirth in which they become a Buddha.

Topic seven outlines six ways that bodhisattvas lead (parigraha) sentient beings to perfection:

1. Leading all sentient beings simultaneously (sakṛtsarvasattva-parigraha). Bodhisattvas regard all sentient beings as their partner.
2. Leading through authority (ādhipatyaparigraha), through a position such as head of a household or a king.
3. Leading an assembly (upādānaparigraha), which refers to residing over a perfect congregation.
4. Guiding for a long time (dīrghakālikam upādānam), is when a bodhisattva must care and guides certain beings slowly and for a long time.
5. Guiding for a short time (adīrghakālikam upādānam), is when they guide beings only for a short time.
6. Final guiding (caramam upādānam) refers to caring for individuals who are very advanced.

Topic eight explains the seven bodhisattva levels (bhūmis) and how they related to the thirteen vihāras.

Topic nine sums up all the bodhisattva practices (caryā) into four main groups:

- The practice of the perfections (pāramitācaryā), the six perfections are outlined and four more perfections are also explained.
- The practice of the factors of Awakening (bodhipakṣyacaryā) which refers to the thirty-seven factors of Awakening, the four investigations, and the four complete knowledges of things as they really are.
- The practice of six clairvoyances (abhijñācaryā)
- The practice of developing sentient beings (sattva-paripākacaryā)

Finally, general topic number ten explains the bodhisattva's ascension (pratiṣṭhā) to Buddhahood along with all the Buddha qualities which are manifested in them (140 exceptional buddha-qualities are outlined. including the 32 marks and the ten powers of a Tathāgata).

=== 13 - Sopadhikā Bhūmiḥ ===
The "Foundation on Having an Existential Substratum" discusses the state of the living arhat, as well as "what it is that forms the remaining layer or basis for continued saṃsāric existence, namely the notion of there being an existential substratum (upadhi)", such as the five aggregates and so forth.

=== 14 - Nirupadhikā Bhūmiḥ ===
The last book, the "Foundation on Being Without an Existential Substratum" explains the state of an arhat who has died and entered parinirvāṇa (final nirvana), and thus is without a substratum for continued existence. This book discusses parinirvāṇa which is said to be complete and eternal extinction and completion (nirvṛti).

== Supplementary Section ==
This part is made up of four 'collections' or 'compendia' (saṃgrahaṇī, shè 攝, bsdu ba), which supplement the Basic Section:

- Viniścayasaṃgrahaṇī (Compendium of Ascertainment). This compendium discusses and provides a clarification (viniścaya) on aspects of the seventeen bhumis from the Basic Section. This section also contains a "detailed treatment of ālayavijñāna and at the same time quoting and making use of the Saṃdhinirmocanasūtra." Thus it is considered a later strata by Schmithausen.
- Vyākhyāsaṃgrahaṇī (Compendium of Exegesis). This is a manual of hermeneutical and exegetical techniques, as well as on rhetorical and logical argument (hetuvidyā).
- Paryāyasaṃgrahaṇī (Compendium of Related Terms). This text defines many of the various strings of quasi-synonymical expressions found in the Āgamas.
- Vastusaṃgrahaṇī (Compendium of [Selected] Themes). Lambert Schmithausen, Florin Delenau and Noritoshi Aramaki all hold that this is part of the oldest textual layer. It includes:
  - The Sūtravastusaṃgrahaṇī which summarizes and explains key topics of each sūtra contained in the Samyukta-āgama.
  - 'The Compendium of the Vinaya' (Vinayavastusaṃgrahaṇī)
  - 'The compendium of Abhidharma lists' (Mātṛkavastusaṃgrahaṇī).

The Chinese version also contains a Compendium of Abhidharma, missing from the Tibetan translation.

An Indian commentary was also written on the YBh, called the Yogācārabhūmivyākhyā.
