= Three marks of existence =

Buddhist concept: impermanence, suffering, and non-self

In Buddhism, the three marks of existence are three characteristics (Pali: tilakkhaṇa; Sanskrit: त्रिलक्षण trilakṣaṇa) of all existence and beings, namely anicca (impermanence), dukkha (commonly translated as "suffering", also rendered as "unsatisfactory", "unease"; from duh-stha, "standing unstable", in context "precarity, instability, an unreliable place to stand".) and anattā (without a lasting essence). (Note: Gombrich (2006, p. 47): All phenomenal existence [in Buddhism] is said to have three interlocking characteristics: impermanence, dukkha and lack of soul, that is, something that does not change.) The insight of humans being subject to the three marks, and insight into these three marks leading to nirvana and liberation, is a central theme in the Buddhist Four Noble Truths and the Noble Eightfold Path.

== Description ==
There are different lists of the "marks of existence" found in the canons of the early Buddhist schools.

=== Three marks ===
In the Pali tradition of the Theravāda school, the three marks are:

- sabbe saṅkhārā aniccā – all saṅkhāras (conditioned things) are impermanent
- sabbe saṅkhārā dukkhā – all saṅkhāras are "unreliable", "precarious", unstable, unsatisfactory, imperfect,
- sabbe dhammā anattā – all dharmas (conditioned or unconditioned things) have no unchanging self or essence

The Mūlasarvāstivāda tradition meanwhile has the following in their Samyukta Āgama:

- All conditioned things are impermanent (sarvasaṃskārā anityāḥ)
- All dharmas are non-self (sarvadharmā anātmānaḥ)
- Nirvāṇa is calm (śāntaṃ nirvāṇam)

=== Four marks ===
In the Ekottarika-āgama and in Mahāyāna sources like the Yogācārabhūmi-Śāstra and The Questions of the Nāga King Sāgara (Sāgaranāgarājaparipṛcchā) however, four characteristics or "four seals of the Dharma" (Sanskrit: dharmoddāna-catuṣṭayaṃ or catvāri dharmapadāni, Chinese: 四法印) are described instead of three:

- All compounded phenomena are impermanent (anitya)
- All contaminated phenomena are without satisfaction (duḥkha)
- All phenomena are without self (anātman)
- Nirvana is peaceful/peace (śānta/śānti)

== Explanation ==
The relationship between the three characteristics is explained in the Pali Canon as follows: What is anicca is dukkha. What is dukkha is anatta (Samyutta Nikaya.Vol4.Page1) - "That which is impermanent is dukkha (i.e. it cannot be made to last). That which is dukkha is not permanent."

=== Anicca ===
Impermanence (Pali: anicca, Sanskrit: anitya) means that all things (saṅkhāra) are in a constant state of flux. Buddhism states that all physical and mental events come into being and dissolve. Human life embodies this flux in the aging process and the cycle of repeated birth and death (Samsara); nothing lasts, and everything decays. This is applicable to all beings and their environs, including beings who are reborn in deva (god) and naraka (hell) realms. This is in contrast to Nibbāna, the reality that is nicca, or knows no change, decay or death.

=== Dukkha ===
Dukkha (Sanskrit: duḥkha), from duḥ-sthā, standing unstable, commonly translated as "suffering", or "pain", also rendered as 'unease', 'unsatifactoriness'. According to Jonathan C. Gold, following Monier-Williams and Christopher Beckwith, a better translation is "unreliable", "precarity, instability, an unreliable place to stand"; Mahasi Sayadaw calls it 'unmanagable, uncontrollable'.

As the First Noble Truth, dukkha is explicated as the physical and mental dissatisfaction of changing conditions as in birth, aging, illness, death; getting what one wishes to avoid or not getting what one wants; and "in short, the five aggregates of clinging and grasping" (skandha). This, however, is a different context, not the Three Marks of Existence, and therefore 'suffering' may not be the best word for it.

Gold argues that "unreliable" and "precarity" ("the state of being uncertain or likely to get worse") makes better sense in the Buddhist teachings such as the three marks of existence, indicating the futility of basing one's sense of selfhood on things and elements that are impermanent, unreliable (changing), and devoid of an unchanging essence.

=== Anattā ===
Anattā (Sanskrit: anatman) refers to there being no permanent essence in any thing or phenomena, including living beings.

While anicca and dukkha apply to "all conditioned phenomena" (saṅkhārā), anattā has a wider scope because it applies to all dhammās without the "conditioned, unconditioned" qualification. Thus, nirvana too is a state of without Self or anattā. The phrase "sabbe dhamma anattā" includes within its scope each skandha (group of aggregates, heaps) that compose any being, and the belief "I am" is a conceit which must be realized to be impermanent and without substance, to end all dukkha. According to Analayo, the phrase "sabbe dhamma anattā" includes all phenomena, and is thus clearly not restricted to the absence of a self in persons.

The anattā doctrine of Buddhism denies that there is anything permanent in any person to call one's Self, and that a belief in a Self is a source of dukkha. Some Buddhist traditions and scholars, however, interpret the anattā doctrine to be strictly in regard to the five aggregates rather than a universal truth. Religious studies scholar Alexander Wynne calls anattā a "not-self" teaching rather than a "no-self" teaching.

== Application ==
In Buddhism, ignorance (avidyā, or moha; i.e. a failure to grasp directly) of the three marks of existence is regarded as the first link in the overall process of saṃsāra whereby a being is subject to repeated existences in an endless cycle of dukkha. As a consequence, dissolving that ignorance through direct insight into the three marks is said to bring an end to saṃsāra and, as a result, to that dukkha (dukkha nirodha or nirodha sacca, as described in the third of the Four Noble Truths).

Gautama Buddha taught that all beings conditioned by causes (saṅkhāra) are impermanent (anicca) and suffering (dukkha), and that not-self (anattā) characterises all dhammas, meaning there is no "I", "me", or "mine" in either the conditioned or the unconditioned (i.e. nibbāna). The teaching of three marks of existence in the Pāli Canon is credited to the Buddha.

== See also ==
- Anussati
- Ātman
- Buddhist paths to liberation
- Dependent Origination
- Four Dharma Seals
- Index of Buddhism-related articles
- Nirodha
- Noble Eightfold Path
- Samatha-Vipassanā
- Similarities between Pyrrhonism and Buddhism

== Sources ==
- Alexander, James (2019), "The State Is the Attempt to Strip Metaphor Out of Politics", in Kos, Eric S. (ed.), Michael Oakeshott on Authority, Governance, and the State, Springer
- Analayo (2013), Satipatthana. The Direct Path to Realization (PDF), Windhorse Publications
- Beckwith, Christopher I. (2015). Greek Buddha: Pyrrho's Encounter with Early Buddhism in Central Asia (PDF). Princeton University Press. ISBN 9781400866328.
- Buswell Jr., Robert E.; Lopez Jr., Donald S. (2013). The Princeton Dictionary of Buddhism. Princeton University Press. ISBN 978-1-4008-4805-8.
- Collins, Steven (1998). Nirvana and Other Buddhist Felicities. Cambridge University Press. ISBN 978-0-521-57054-1.
- Gold, Jonathan C. (2023). "Pyrrho's Buddha on Duḥkha and the Liberation from Views". Journal of the American Academy of Religion, Volume 91, Issue 3, September 2023, Pages 655–679.
- Gombrich, Richard (2006). Theravada Buddhism. Routledge. ISBN 978-1-134-90352-8.
- Monier-Williams, Monier (1899), A Sanskrit-English Dictionary (PDF), London: Oxford University Press
- Olson, Carl (2005). The Different Paths of Buddhism: A Narrative-Historical Introduction. Rutgers University Press. ISBN 978-0-8135-3778-8.
- Walsh, Maurice (1995), The Long Discourses of the Buddha. A Translation of the Dīgha Nikāya, Wisdom Publications
