= Chanda (Buddhism) =

Concept in Buddhism

Translations of Chanda
- English: intention, interest, desire to act, aspiration
- Sanskrit: छन्द
- Pali: chanda
- Burmese: ဆန္ဒ
- Chinese: 欲(T) / 欲(S)
- Indonesian: hasrat, keinginan
- Japanese: 欲 (Rōmaji: Yoku)
- Korean: 욕 (RR: yok)
- Tibetan: འདུན་པ། (Wylie: 'dun pa; THL: dünpa)
- Vietnamese: dục

Chanda (Sanskrit, Pali; Tibetan: ‘dun pa) is translated as "intention", "interest", or "desire to act". Chanda is identified within the Buddhist Abhidharma teachings as follows:

- One of the six occasional mental factors in the Theravada Abhidhamma; in this tradition, chanda is a factor that can have positive or negative result depending upon the mental factors that it is co-joined with.
- One of the four bases of power (iddhipāda), which constitute the bodhipakkhiyādhammā
- One of the Ten mahā-bhūmika in Sarvastivada Abhidharma.
- One of the five object-determining mental factors in the Mahayana Abhidharma; that is a factor that grasps the specification of the object.
- One of the eight antidotes applied to overcome obstacles in Samatha meditation within the Mahayana tradition.

== Definitions ==
=== Theravada tradition ===
Ajahn Sucitto states:

Desire as an eagerness to offer, to commit, to apply oneself to meditation, is called chanda. It’s a psychological “yes,” a choice, not a pathology. In fact, you could summarize Dhamma training as the transformation of taṇhā into chanda.

Ajahn Jayasāro states: Western presentations of Buddhist teachings have often led to the understanding that suffering arises because of desire, and therefore you shouldn't desire anything. Whereas in fact the Buddha spoke of two kinds of desire: desire that arises from ignorance and delusion which is called taṇhā – craving – and desire that arises from wisdom and intelligence, which is called kusala-chanda, or dhamma-chanda, or most simply chanda. Chanda doesn't mean this exclusively, but in this particular case I'm using chanda to mean wise and intelligent desire and motivation, and the Buddha stressed that this is absolutely fundamental to any progress on the Eightfold Path.... '

The Abhidhammattha-sangaha states:

Chanda here means desire to act (kattu-kamata), that is to perform an action or achieve some result. This kind of desire must be distinguished from desire in the reprehensible sense, that is, from lobha, greed and raga, lust. Whereas the latter terms are invariably unwholesome, chanda is an ethically variable factor which, when conjoined with wholesome concomitants, can function as the virtuous desire to achieve a worthy goal. The characteristic of chanda is desire to act, its function is searching for an object, its manifestation is need for an object and that same object is its proximate cause. It should be regarded as the stretching forth of the mind's hand towards the object.

=== Mahayana tradition ===
The Abhidharma-samuccaya states:

What is interest? It is the desire to endow a desired thing with this or that particular attribute, and has the function of laying the foundation for making a start on assiduous striving.

Alexander Berzin describes 'dun pa as the mental factor "to obtain any object, to achieve any goal, or to do something with the object or goal once obtained or achieved." Berzin explains:

So we have intention (’dun-pa, Skt. chanda). The intention is the wish to obtain an object, or to achieve a goal, or to do something with it. It can be to meet with what we’ve previously met with, not to be parted with what we’re presently being aware of, or it can be keen interest to engage with something in the future. So Buddha has the intention to benefit everybody. I mean, we have intention all the time. I’m looking at this cup of water, paying attention to it, etc., and there’s the intention: What am I going to do with it? I’m going to pick it up and drink it. So, obviously, because we have intention we would like to make it pure and have a pure intention to benefit everybody—no matter what we’re doing, may it be of benefit to everyone.

== Alternate translations ==
- Aspiration (Jeffery Hopkins)
- Desire to act (Bhikkhu Bodhi)
- Desire as an eagerness to commit (Ajahn Sucitto)
- Intention (Erik Pema Kunsang, Alexander Berzin)
- Interest (Herbert Guenther)
- Zeal (Nina van Gorkom)

== See also ==
- Mental factors (Buddhism)
- Taṇhā

== Sources ==
- Bodhi, Bhikkhu (1999), Abhidhammatta Sangaha: A Comprehensive Manual of Abhidhamma, BPS Pariyatti Editions, ISBN 978-1-928706-02-1
- Gethin, R.M.L. (2001), The Buddhist Path to Awakening, Oneworld Publications, ISBN 978-1851682850
- Guenther, Herbert V.; Kawamura, Leslie S. (1975), Mind in Buddhist Psychology: A Translation of Ye-shes rgyal-mtshan's "The Necklace of Clear Understanding", Dharma Publishing, ISBN 978-0913546062
- Sucitto, Ahahn (2010), Turning the Wheel of Truth: Commentary on the Buddha's First Teaching, Shambhala Publications, ISBN 978-1590307649
