= Five faults and eight antidotes =

The five faults and eight antidotes are factors of samatha meditation identified in the Tibetan Buddhist tradition. The five faults identify obstacles to meditation practice, and the eight antidotes are applied to overcome the five faults. This system originates with Maitreyanātha's Madhyānta-vibhāga and is elaborated upon in further texts, such as Kamalaśīla's Stages of Meditation (Bhāvanākrama). (Note: Kenchen Thrangu Rinpoche states: "There are five faults that have to be eliminated through eight kinds of actions or antidotes. These five faults or defects prevent the development of meditation and are described by Asanga in the teachings of Maitreya in the Differentiation of the Middle Way from the Extremes.") This formulation has been commented upon by generations of Tibetan commentators. This formulation derives originally from the Yogācāra tradition.

== The five faults ==
The five faults (Sanskrit: ādīnava; Tibetan: nyes-dmigs) of shamatha meditation according to the textual tradition (Note: Kenchen Thrangu Rinpoche states: "In the Treasury of Knowledge the practice of meditation is described in terms of the textual tradition and also in terms of the oral instructions of the great meditators. The texts are important because they describe and explain the meaning of the teachings of the Buddha, and the instructions are important because they come from the actual experience of meditating. [...] the textual tradition [...] describes meditation in terms of the five things that can cause meditation to go wrong and the eight ways to eliminate these faults.") of Tibetan Buddhism are:

1. Laziness (kausīdya, le-lo)
2. Forgetting the instruction (avavādasammosa, gdams-ngag brjed-pa)
3. Agitation (auddhatya, rgod-pa) and dullness (laya, bying-ba)
4. Non-application (anabhisamskāra, ’du mi-byed-pa)
5. Over-application (abhisamskāra, ’du byed-pa)

=== Laziness ===
Laziness (kausīdya) "prevents the application of meditation because one doesn't even begin after receiving instructions in meditation."

Sakyong Mipham explains:

One of the most challenging obstacles for a beginning meditator is Laziness. Laziness can be an obstacle even before we reach our seat, because it can keep us from ever getting there. [...] Laziness has a draining quality, as if we are low in life-force. Sometimes it's hard to see it because it feels like who we are. It encroaches on our most intimate ground. It manifests as an allegiance to comfort. We may get plenty of sleep, but we are completely uninspired. We'd rather lie around on a couch watching television, or read a magazine and pass out on the floor. [...] We have to understand that from the meditative view, laziness is a particular way of holding the mind. The mind has withdrawn into itself. In its more extreme versions — when we are really lazy — the whole world seems very distant. It seems impossible to do anything.

There are three types of laziness:

1. Laziness of not wanting to do anything
2. Laziness of discouragement (or feeling ourselves unworthy)
3. Laziness of being busy with worldly things.

=== Forgetting the instructions ===
Forgetting the instructions (avavādasammosa) means a lack of mindfulness on how to do meditation properly.

Sakyong Mipham explains:

When we forget the instructions, what we're holding our mind to is discursiveness. We're on the cushion, so wrapped up in thought that we can't remember what we are supposed to be doing. The instruction to stay present seems weak compared to the power of our distractions. Forgetting the instructions can happen suddenly or it can happen gradually as if we are losing our grip on a heavy object. No matter how hard we try, we can't stay focused on the breath. The technique becomes blurry. Nothing inspirational comes to mind. We can only remember a couple of words: "sit," "breath," "thought," "mind." Apart from that, we can't remember anything. Not only have we forgotten the simple instructions. We might also have forgotten the view – the reason we are meditating.

=== Agitation and dullness (too tight and too loose) ===
These two factors, agitation (auddhatya) and dullness (laya), are classified as a single fault. Sakyong Mipham describes these factors as "too tight" and "too loose."

==== Agitation ====
The Sanskrit term auddhatya is translated as:

- Agitation (Traleg Kyabon, Kenchen Thrangu)
- Elation (Sakyong Mipham)
- Ebullience (Herbert Guenther)
- Excitation (B. Allan Wallace)
- Excitement (Erik Pema Kunsang)
- Flightiness of mind (Alexander Berzin)
- Mental flightiness (Alexander Berzin)
- Too tight (Sakyong Mipham)

Kenchen Thrangu Rinpoche states: "There are [...] two kinds of agitation. There is an obvious kind in which one keeps thinking about what one has done or what fun one has had, so one is unable to rest the mind upon anything. In its subtle form one has apparent stability of mind, but there are still subtle thoughts that keep coming up."

==== Dullness ====
The Sanskrit term laya is translated as:

- Dullness (Kenchen Thrangu)
- Drowsiness (Traleg Kyabgon)
- Laxity (Sakyong Mipham)
- Mental dullness (Alexander Berzin)
- Sinking (Alexander Berzin)
- Stupor (Kenchen Thrangu)
- Too loose (Sakyong Mipham)

Kenchen Thrangu Rinpoche states: "In stupor the mind is cloudy and dull. In its obvious form there is a loss of clarity of mind. In its subtle form there is some clarity, but it is very weak."

Laxity may be coarse (audārika, rags-pa) or subtle (sūksma, phra-mo). Lethargy (styāna, rmugs-pa) is often also present, but is said to be less common.

=== Non-application ===
Non-application (anabhisamskāra) means not applying the antidotes. (Note: Achieving Shamatha, by Alexander Berzin) Kenchen Thrangu states that non-application "occurs when dullness or agitation appear in one's meditation and one recognizes these thoughts, but doesn't apply a remedy. If one does not apply the remedy, meditation will not develop."

=== Over-application ===
Over-application (abhisamskāra) means that meditator does not stop applying the antidotes even when they are no longer necessary. Kenchen Thrangu explains:

For example, dullness or agitation may appear in one's meditation, the remedy is applied, and the dullness or agitation is eliminated. Yet one continues to apply the remedy even though it is no longer useful. This is the fault of overapplication. The remedies should be used only when agitation and dullness appear; when they are eliminated, one should just rest in equanimity.

== The eight antidotes ==
The eight antidotes (Sanskrit: pratipakṣa; Tibetan: gnyen-po) or applications (Sanskrit: abhisamskāra; Tibetan: ’du-byed pa) to the five faults of meditation are:

- Antidotes to laziness:

1. belief, trust, faith (śraddhā, dad-pa)
2. aspiration (chanda, ’dun-pa)
3. effort (vyayama, rtsol-ba)
4. suppleness, pliancy (praśrabdhi, shin-sbyangs)

- Antidote to forgetting the instructions:

5. mindfulness (smṛti, dran-pa)

- Antidote to agitation and dullness

6. awareness (samprajaña, shes-bzhin)

- Antidote to non-application

7. application (abhisaṃskāra, ’du byed-pa)

- Antidote to overapplication

8. non-application (anabhisaṃskāra, ’du mi-byed-pa)

=== Antidotes to laziness ===
The four antidotes to laziness are belief (śraddhā), aspiration (chanda), effort (vyayama), and suppleness (praśrabdhi). These four antidotes are not always presented in the same order. For example, the antidotes are presented by the following commentators in the order shown (and using the translations of the commentator):

- Alexander Berzin: belief in a fact; intention; joyful perseverance; a sense of fitness
- Kenchen Thrangu: aspiration; zeal; faith; well trained.
- Sakyong Mipham: suppleness; trust; aspiration; effort.
- Traleg Kyabgon: conviction; inclination; vigor; pliancy of body and mind.

==== Belief ====
Belief (śraddhā) is one of four antidotes to laziness.

The Sanskrit term śraddhā is translated as:

- Belief in a fact (Alexander Berzin)
- Conviction (Traleg Kyabgon)
- Faith (Kenchen Thrangu)
- Trust (Sakyong Mipham)

Sakyong Mipham states:

When we've heard the teachings and also experienced their true meaning – that to practice shamatha is to abide peacefully – a certain faith develops. This isn't blind faith. It's based on our own relationship with meditation. We have faith in a practice that we have experienced ourselves.

Kenchen Thrangu states that although śraddhā is similar to the antidote of aspiration, aspiration means that one has something to aspire to, while faith means a belief in something very valuable.

Traleg Kyabgon states: "Conviction can develop only if we are convinced of the benefits of meditation and the harm that conflicting emotions cause in a distracted confused mind."

Traditionally, it is said that belief can be developed by contemplating the faults of distraction (vikṣepa, rnam-par gyen-ba).

==== Aspiration ====
Aspiration (chanda) is one of four antidotes to laziness.

The Sanskrit term chanda is translated as:

- Aspiration (Jeffery Hopkins, Sakyong Mipham, Kenchen Thrangu)
- Inclination (Traleg Kyabgon)
- Intention (Erik Pema Kunsang, Alexander Berzin)
- Interest (Herbert Guenther, Kenchen Thrangu)

Sakyong Mipham states:

Aspiration is trust with a sense of determination. We are determined to discover our own awakeness. We aspire to be like the Buddha, like someone who has mastered their whole being, someone who realizes the profound truth of things as they are. We have seen the volatility of external conditions. We have become dissatisfied with hope and fear as a way of life. Now we aspire to depend upon our own stability, clarity, and strength.

Kenchen Thrangu explains:

[Aspiration means] that one likes to meditate and is happy meditating. One could say that one is attached to meditation, but this attachment is positive, so we use the word aspiration because the attachment is to something that is not negative and harmful.

==== Effort ====
Effort (vyayama) is one of four antidotes to laziness.

The Sanskrit term vyayama is translated as follows:

- Effort (Sakyong Mipham)
- Exertion
- Joyful perseverance (Alexander Berzin)
- Vigor (Traleg Kyabgon)
- Zeal (Kenchen Thrangu)

Kenchen Thrangu states: "If one has interest and motivation to practice, then one doesn't have to force oneself to practice meditation; there will be a natural zeal to practice."

==== Suppleness ====
Suppleness (praśrabdhi) is one of four antidotes to laziness.

The Sanskrit term praśrabdhi is translated as:

- Flexible (Kenchen Thrangu)
- Pliancy of body and mind (Traleg Kyabgon)
- Sense of fitness (Alexander Berzin)
- Supple (Kenchen Thrangu)
- Suppleness (Sakyong Mipham)
- Well trained (Kenchen Thrangu)

Kenchen Thrangu states:

This means that one's mind is ready at any moment to meditate. One doesn't have to think, "Oh, now I'm going to have to meditate-how difficult, what a strain meditation is."

=== Antidote to forgetting the instructions ===
==== Mindfulness ====
The antidote to forgetting the instructions is mindfulness (smṛti).

Sakyong Mipham states:

The antidote to forgetting the instructions is mindfulness – in particular, remembering. We need to remind ourselves continuously of the details. If you have forgotten what you are doing with your mind, almost inevitably, you've also forgotten what you are doing with your body. Start by remembering your posture. Is your spine still upright? Are you relaxed, or are you holding tension in your shoulders and arms? What are you doing with your gaze? Simply checking your posture and starting your meditation over – "Now I'm placing my mind on my breath" – can be the most direct way to invoke the instructions when you've forgotten in the middle of a session.

Kenchen Thrangu states:

Mindfulness has three characteristics. First, one has a sharpness and clearness of mind in which the instructions are not forgotten. Second, although the mind is very sharp and focused, there are not many thoughts arising because meditation is nonconceptual, so there are not many thoughts arising and the mind is naturally focused one-pointedly on an object. Third, because one has trust and faith and has the suppleness or flexibility of having become well trained, meditation becomes pleasant with a sense of comfort and pleasure. These three qualities in one's meditation cause the meditation instructions not to be forgotten.

=== Antidote to agitation and dullness ===
==== Awareness ====
The antidote to agitation and dullness is awareness (samprajaña, shes-bzhin).

Sakyong Mipham states:

The antidote to both elation and laxity is awareness. We have to look at what's going on in our mind. Once awareness has told us that we are too loose or too tight, we have to learn how to adjust. If the obstacle is elation, we might try relaxing the technique, giving it a bit more room. We could give our outbreath more focus than our inbreath so that the mind has more freedom. [...] If the obstacle is laxity, we need to tighten up our practice. We can bring more of our mind to the breathing overall. We could focus on the inbreath. We can stabilize our posture. We might try to perk up by removing a layer of clothing, opening a window, or raising our gaze.

=== Antidote to non-application ===
The antidote to non-application is identified as either of the following mental factors:

- application (abhisaṃskāra, ’du byed-pa), or
- attention (cetanā, sems pa)

Kenchen Thrangu states:

The fourth fault is inactivity in which one experiences dullness or agitation in one's meditation but does nothing about it. When this happens, one will fall under its power and obviously not be able to work toward enlightenment. When one recognizes that there is dullness or agitation during meditation, one should remember and apply the remedies with diligence. So performing the proper remedy will eliminate the defect of inactivity.

=== Antidote to over-application ===
The antidote to over-application is identified as either:

- non-application (anabhisaṃskāra, ’du mi-byed-pa), or
- equanimity (upekṣā, btang snyoms)

Kenchen Thrangu states:

The fifth fault is the defect of overactivity, which means that when one is meditating with none of the five faults, one shouldn't do anything but rest in that meditative state. Doing this will eliminate the defect of overactivity.

== Relation to the nine mental abidings ==
According to Geshe Gedun Lodro, whoever cultivates the nine mental abidings overcomes the five faults through the eight antidotes, and, conversely, whoever overcomes the five faults through the eight antidotes likewise cultivates the nine mental abidings.

The Dalai Lama states: "Through applying the eight antidotes the five faults are gradually eliminated, and one passes through nine stages of concentration."

== Relation to the five hindrances ==
The five hindrances to concentration is another list of obstacles to meditation that is presented in both the Pali texts and the Mahayana texts. The system of the five faults and eight antidotes is presented only in certain Mahayana texts. Thubten Chodron states: (Note: Fault of laziness, by Thubten Chodron)

[...] the five hindrances to concentration [...] are presented both in the Pali texts and the Mahayana texts. However, Maitreya and Asanga, in their Mahayana texts, presented a list of five faults to concentration and eight antidotes. There's some overlap between these two sets of the five hindrances and the five faults. But there are also some differences so it’s good to go through both sets. This then gives us a rounded, complete picture of how to generate concentration.

== Sources ==
- Dalai Lama (1975), The Buddhism Of Tibet and the Key to the Middle Way, Harper & Row
- Dalai Lama (2002), The Buddhism Of Tibet, Snow Lion
- Denma Locho Rinpoche; Lati Rinpoche (1996), Meditative States in Tibetan Buddhism, Wisdom, ISBN 0-86171-119-X
- Geshe Gedun Lodro (1998), Calm Abiding And Special Insight: Achieving Spiritual Transformation Through Meditation, Snow Lion
- Goleman, Daniel (2008), Destructive Emotions: A Scientific Dialogue with the Dalai Lama (Kindle ed.), Bantam
- Guenther, Herbert V.; Kawamura, Leslie S. (1975), Mind in Buddhist Psychology: A Translation of Ye-shes rgyal-mtshan's "The Necklace of Clear Understanding (Kindle ed.), Dharma Publishing
- Khenchen Thrangu Rinpoche (1993), The Practice of Tranquility & Insight: A Guide to Tibetan Buddhist Meditation (Kindle ed.), Snow Lion, pp. 39–45
- Kunsang, Erik Pema (2004), Gateway to Knowledge, Vol. 1, North Atlantic Books
- Sakyong Mipham (2003), Turning the Mind into an Ally, Riverhead Books, pp. 84–113
- Traleg Kyabgon (2001), The Essence of Buddhism, Shambhala, pp. 61–68
- Zahler, Leah (2009), Study and Practice of Meditation: Tibetan Interpretations of the Concentrations and Formless Absorptions, Snow Lion
