= Byādhi (Buddhism) =

Translations of byādhi
- English: illness
- Sanskrit: vyādhi
- Pali: byādhi
- Khmer: ព្យាធិ (Pyear thik)

Byādhi (Pali; Sanskrit: vyādhi) is a Buddhist term that is commonly translated as sickness, illness, disease, etc., (Note: Byadhi - definition) and is identified as an aspect of dukkha (suffering) within the teachings on the Four Noble Truths.

== Within the Four Noble Truths ==
Within the teachings on the Four Noble Truths, byādhi is identified as an aspect of dukkha (suffering). For example, The Discourse That Sets Turning the Wheel of Truth states: (Note: Setting in Motion the Wheel of the Dhamma)

1. Now this, bhikkhus, is the noble truth of suffering [dukkha]: birth is suffering, aging is suffering, illness (byādhi) is suffering, death is suffering; union with what is displeasing is suffering; separation from what is pleasing is suffering; not to get what one wants is suffering; in brief, the five aggregates subject to clinging are suffering.

Byādhi can refer to physical or psychological sickness. Chogyam Trunpa explains the suffering (dukkha) of sickness as follows:

When you are sick, you feel physically dejected by life, with all sorts of complaints, aches, and pains. When you get attacked by sickness, you begin to feel the loss of the beautiful wings and nice feathers you used to have. Everything is disheveled. You can't even smile or laugh at your own jokes. You are completely demoralized and under attack.

== Sources ==
- Ajahn Sumedho (2002), The Four Noble Truths, Amaravati Publications
- Ajahn Sucitto (2010), Turning the Wheel of Truth: Commentary on the Buddha's First Teaching, Shambhala
- Bhikkhu, Thanissaro (1997), Tittha Sutta: Sectarians, AN 3.61
- Bodhi, Bhikkhu (2000), The Connected Discourses of the Buddha: A New Translation of the Samyutta Nikaya, Boston: Wisdom Publications, ISBN 0-86171-331-1
- Gethin, Rupert (1998), Foundations of Buddhism, Oxford University Press
- Moffitt, Phillip (2008), Dancing with Life: Buddhist Insights for Finding Meaning and Joy in the Face of Suffering, Rodale, Kindle Edition
- Nhat Hanh, Thich (1999), The Heart of the Buddha's Teaching, Three River Press
- Rahula, Walpola (2007), What the Buddha Taught, Grove Press, Kindle Edition
- Trungpa, Chogyam (2009), The Truth of Suffering and the Path of Liberation (edited by Judy Leif), Shambhala
- Tulku, Ringu (2005), Daring Steps Toward Fearlessness: The Three Vehicles of Tibetan Buddhism, Snow Lion
