= Four Dharma Seals =

Characteristics of Buddhist teachings

Four Dharma Seals are the four characteristics which reflect some Buddhist teaching. It is said that if a teaching contains the Four Dharma Seals then it can be considered Buddha Dharma. This is despite the fact that some believe that the Dharma Seals were all introduced after Gautama Buddha died.

== The Four Seals ==
The Four Seals can be variously translated as follows:

- All compounded things are impermanent
- Emotions are prone to suffering
- All phenomena are without inherent existence
- Nirvana is beyond extremes

- All compounded things are impermanent.
- All contaminated things are suffering.
- All phenomena are empty and devoid of self.
- Nirvana is true peace.

- Everything conditioned is impermanent.
- Everything influenced by delusion is suffering.
- All things are empty and selfless.
- Nirvana is peace.

As suffering is not an inherent aspect of existence sometimes the second seal is omitted to make Three Dharma Seals. However, when the second seal is taken to refer to existence contaminated by or influenced by the mental afflictions of ignorance, attachment, and anger and their conditioning actions (karma), this omission is not necessary.

== See also ==
- Dependent Origination
- Three marks of existence
- Ātman (Buddhism)
