= Praśrabhi =

Buddhist term

Translations of Prasrabhi
- English: pliancy, alertness, flexibility
- Sanskrit: प्रश्रब्धि, prasrabhi, praśrabdhi
- Pali: passaddhi
- Chinese: 輕安(T) / 轻安(S)
- Korean: 경안 (RR: gyeongan)
- Tibetan: ཤིན་ཏུ་སྦྱང་བ། (Wylie: shin tu sbyang ba; THL: shintu jangwa)

Prasrabhi (Sanskrit; Tibetan: ཤིན་ཏུ་སྦྱང་བ་, Tibetan Wylie: shin tu sbyang ba, Pali: passaddhi) is a Mahayana Buddhist term translated as "pliancy", "flexibility", or "alertness". It is defined as the ability to apply body and mind towards virtuous activity. Prasrabhi is identified as:

- One of the eleven virtuous mental factors within the Mahayana Abhidharma teachings.
- One of the eight antidotes applied to overcome obstacles in Samatha meditation within the Mahayana tradition.

The Abhidharma-samuccaya states:

What is alertness? It is the pliability of body and mind in order to interrupt the continuity of the feeling of sluggishness in body and mind. Its function is to do away with all obscurations.

== See also ==
- Mental factors (Buddhism)
- Passaddhi - the equivalent term in Theravada
