= Duḥkha =

Concept in Buddhism, Hinduism and Jainism

Translations of Duḥkha
- English: uneasy, uncomfortable, unpleasant, often translated as suffering or pain; in context “unstable”, "unbalanced", "unreliable", "precarity, instability, an unreliable place to stand"; also interpreted as "restlessness", "a sense of unease, dissatisfaction, or incompleteness"
- Sanskrit: दुःख (IAST: Duḥkha)
- Pali: Dukkha
- Bengali: দুঃখ (dukkhô)
- Burmese: ဒုက္ခ (MLCTS: doʊʔkʰa̰)
- Chinese: 苦 (Pinyin: kǔ)
- Japanese: 苦 (Rōmaji: ku)
- Khmer: ទុក្ខ (UNGEGN: tŭkkh)
- Korean: 고 苦 (RR: ko)
- Shan: တုၵ်ႉၶ ([tṵ̂kkha])
- Sinhala: දුක්ඛ සත්‌යය (dukkha satyaya)
- Tagalog: ᜇᜓᜃ᜔ᜑ dukha
- Tamil: துக்கம் (thukkam)
- Tibetan: སྡུག་བསྔལ། (Wylie: sdug bsngal; THL: dukngal)
- Thai: ทุกข์ (RTGS: thuk)
- Vietnamese: 苦 khổ 災害; Bất toại

Duḥkha (/ˈduːkə/; Sanskrit: दुःख, Pali: dukkha) "uneasy, uncomfortable, unpleasant", often translated as "suffering", "pain", is an important concept in Buddhism, Jainism and Hinduism, where it contextually takes the meaning of “unstable”, "unbalanced", "precarity, instability, an unreliable place to stand".

The term is derived from duḥ-sthā, 'standing unstable', but was Prākritized to duhkha. Its literal meaning as "suffering" has been criticized, (Note: Unsatisfactory: Analayo (2013), Satipaṭṭhāna: The Direct Path to Realization: "Dukkha is often translated as 'suffering'. Suffering, however, represents only one aspect of dukkha, a term whose range of implications is difficult to capture with a single English word [...] In order to catch the various nuances of 'dukkha', the most convenient translation is 'unsatisfactoriness', though it might be best to leave the term untranslated."; Gombrich, How Buddhism Began: "The first Noble Truth is the single word dukkha, and it is explicated to mean that everything in our experience of life is ultimately unsatisfactory"; Dalai Lama, Thubten Chodron, Approaching the Buddhist Path, p.279 note 2: "Duhkha (P. dukkha) is often translated as "suffering," but this translation is misleading. Its meaning is more nuanced and refers to all unsatisfactory states and experiences, many of which are not explicitly painful. While the Buddha says that life under the influence of afflictions and polluted karma is unsatisfactory, he does not say that life is suffering."; Roderick Bucknell, Martin Stuart-Fox, The Twilight Language, p.161: "Thus dukkha at the most subtle level appears to refer to a normally unperceived unsatisfactory quality"; Gombrich, What the Buddha Thought, p.10: "there has been a lot of argument over how to translate the word dukkha; and again, the choice of translation must depend heavily on the context. But what is being expressed is that life as we normally experience it is unsatisfactory."; Kelly (2026) "restlessness", "a sense of unease, dissatisfaction, or incompleteness") and it has also been rendered as "restlessness", "a sense of unease, dissatisfaction, or incompleteness", the (sense of) "unsatisfactoriness" or "unease" of craving for and grasping after transient 'things' (i.e. sensory objects, including thoughts), or expecting pleasure from them while ignorant of this transientness. (Note: Translations of duhkha: * Nyanatiloka Thera 2004, p. 61: dukkha (1) 'pain', painful feeling, which may be bodily and mental [...] 2. 'Suffering', 'ill'. * Huxter 2016, p. 10: "dukkha (unsatisfactoriness or suffering) (....) In the Introduction I wrote that dukkha is probably best understood as unsatisfactoriness." : "(...) the three characteristics of samsara/sankhara (the realm of rebirth): anicca (impermance), dukkha (pain) and anatta (no-self)." See also the Anuradha Sutta: To Anuradha)

In Buddhism, dukkha is part of the first of the Four Noble Truths and one of the three marks of existence. The term also appears in scriptures of Hinduism, such as the Upanishads, in discussions of moksha (spiritual liberation).

== Etymology and meaning ==
Duḥkha (Sanskrit: दुःख; Pali: dukkha) has a broad range of meanings, including "uneasy, uncomfortable, unpleasant, difficult", "unpleasant, painful, causing misery", and is commonly translated as "suffering" or "pain". The term duḥkha though does not have a one-word English translation, and embodies diverse aspects of unpleasant human experiences. It is often understood as the opposite of sukha, meaning lasting "happiness", "comfort" or "ease".

=== Etymology ===
While the term dukkha has often been derived from the prefix du- ("bad" or "difficult") and the root kha ("empty", "hole"), meaning a badly fitting axle-hole of a cart or chariot giving "a very bumpy ride", it may actually be derived from duḥ-stha, a "dis-/ bad- + stand-", that is, "standing badly, unsteady", "unstable".

==== Axle hole ====
The word has been explained in recent times as a derivation from Aryan terminology for an axle hole, referring to an axle hole which is not in the center and leads to a bumpy, uncomfortable ride. According to Winthrop Sargeant,

The ancient Aryans who brought the Sanskrit language to India were a nomadic, horse- and cattle-breeding people who travelled in horse- or ox-drawn vehicles. Su- and dus- are prefixes indicating good or bad. The word kha, in later Sanskrit meaning "sky," "ether," or "space," was originally the word for "hole," particularly an axle hole of one of the Aryan's vehicles. Thus sukha ... meant, originally, "having a good axle hole," while duḥkha meant "having a poor axle hole," leading to discomfort.

Joseph Goldstein, American vipassana teacher and writer, explains the etymology as follows:

The word dukkha is made up of the prefix du- and the root kha. Du- means "bad" or "difficult". Kha means "empty". "Empty", here, refers to several things—some specific, others more general. One of the specific meanings refers to the empty axle hole of a wheel. If the axle fits badly into the center hole, we get a very bumpy ride. This is a good analogy for our ride through saṃsāra.

==== 'Standing unstable' ====
However, according to Monier Monier-Williams, the actual roots of the Pali term dukkha appear to be Sanskrit दुस्- (dus-, "bad") + स्था (sthā, "to stand"). (Note: Monier-Williams 1899, p. 483, entry note: : "according to grammarians properly written dush-kha and said to be from duḥ- and kha [cf. su-khá]; but more probably a Prākritized form for duḥ-sthā, q.v.") Irregular phonological changes in the development of Sanskrit into the various Prakrits led to a shift from dus-sthā to duḥkha to dukkha.

Bhikkhu Anālayo concurs, stating that dukkha as derived from duḥ-sthā, "standing badly", "conveys nuances of "uneasiness" or of being "uncomfortable". Silk Road philologist Christopher I. Beckwith elaborates on this derivation. According to Beckwith:

... although the sense of duḥkha in Normative Buddhism is traditionally given as 'suffering', that and similar interpretations are highly unlikely for Early Buddhism. Significantly, Monier-Williams himself doubts the usual explanation of duḥkha and presents an alternative one immediately after it, namely: duḥ-stha "'standing badly,' unsteady, disquieted (lit. and fig.); uneasy", and so on. This form is also attested, and makes much better sense as the opposite of the Rig Veda sense of sukha, which Monier-Williams gives in full.

Likewise, sukha may have developed from suṣṭha, "standing well", as suggested by Jacobi in the 19th century. Jamison and Brereton (2014) translate sukha ratha (Ṛgveda 1.20.3) as "well-naved chariot", derived from su ("good, well") and kha ("nave" of a chariot).

Beckwith bases his apprehension on similarities between Pyrrhonism and Buddhism, noting that Pyrrho gave a translation of the three marks of existence, translating dukkha into Greek as astathmēta, “unstable”, "unbalanced", "unreliable". (Note: See also Doug Bates (2024), What the Buddha Knew about Dukkha that We Don’t.) (Note: Beckwith argues that the Greek philosopher Pyrrho (c. 360 – c. 270 BC) based his new philosophy, Pyrrhonism, on elements of Early Buddhism.)

=== Translation ===
==== 'Suffering', unease ====
The literal meaning of duḥkha, as used in a general sense is "uneasy" or "unpleasant", and is often translated as "suffering" or "pain". (Note: Harvey (2013, p. 30): "'suffering' is an appropriate translation only in a general, inexact sense [...] In the passage on the first True Reality, dukkha in 'birth is dukkha' is an adjective [...] The best translation here is by the English adjective 'painful,' which can apply to a range of things.") Its exact translation depends on the context. (Note: Gombrich, What the Buddha Thought, p.10: "there has been a lot of argument over how to translate the word dukkha; and again, the choice of translation must depend heavily on the context.") Following this literal meaning, contemporary translators of Buddhist texts use a variety of English words to convey the aspects of dukh. Early Western translators of Buddhist texts (before the 1970s) typically translated the Pali term dukkha as "suffering".

Later translators have emphasized that "suffering" is a too limited translation for the term duḥkha, and have preferred to either leave the term untranslated, or to clarify that translation with terms such as anxiety, distress, frustration, unease, "a persistent sense of dissatisfaction or incompleteness", not having what one wants, having what one does not want, restlessness. (Note: Contemporary translators have used a variety of English words to translate the term duḥkha; translators commonly use different words to translate aspects of the term. For example, duḥkha has been translated as follows in many contexts: Suffering (Harvey, Williams, Keown, Anderson, Gombrich, Thich Nhat Hanh, Ajahn Succito, Chogyam Trungpa, Rupert Gethin, Dalai Lama, et al.); Pain (Harvey, Williams, Keown, Anderson, Huxter, Gombrich, et al); Unsatisfactoriness (Dalai Lama, Bhikkhu Bodhi, Rupert Gethin, et al.); Stress (Thanissaro Bhikkhu: Dhammacakkappavattana Sutta, Anuradha Sutta bottom); Sorrow; Anguish; Affliction (Brazier); Dissatisfaction (Pema Chodron, Chogyam Trunpa); Distress (Walpola Rahula); Frustration (Dalai Lama, Four Noble Truths, p. 38); Misery; Anxiety (Chogyam Trungpa, The Truth of Suffering, pp. 8–10); Uneasiness (Chogyam Trungpa); Unease (Rupert Gethin); Unhappiness; Kelly (2026): "a sense of unease, dissatisfaction, or incompleteness"; "restlessness") In the sequence "birth is painful", dukhka may be translated as "painful".

The term "unsatisfactoriness", or "a persistent sense of dissatisfaction or incompleteness", is often used to emphasize the unsatisfactoriness of "life under the influence of afflictions and polluted karma".

==== Precarity ====
According to Jonathan C. Gold, given Beckwits translation of dukkha as "unreliable", "unstable", "duḥkha just means precarity, instability, an unreliable place to stand", referring to "bumpiness, instability, and uncertainty—not a good ride, not a safe place to stand, being unreliable.

Gold argues that "unreliable" and "precarity" ("the state of being uncertain or likely to get worse") makes better sense in the Buddhist teachings such as the three marks of existence, indicating the futility of basing one's sense of selfhood on things and elements that impermant, unreliable (changing), devoid of an unchanging essence. (Note: See also Sutta Central, Dukkha as "Unreliable" or "Precarious" instead of "Suffering".)

Valters Negribs notes the following quote from the Buddhist Udāna: "Everything that is not under one’s control is duḥkha. Everything that one is a master of is sukha’ (sabbaṁ paravasaṁ dukkhaṁ, sabbaṁ issariyaṁ sukham; Udāna 2.9)."

== Buddhism ==
=== Early Buddhism ===
Dukkha is one of the three marks of existence, namely anicca ("impermanent"), dukkha ('unease'; "unreliable", "precarious", "out of control"), anatta (without a lasting essence). (Note: Beckwith: "The Buddha says All dharmas [= pragmata] are: anitya "impermanent"; dukkha "unsatisfactory, imperfect, unstable"; anatman "without an innate self-identity")

In Buddhism, saṃsāra refers to an ongoing cycle of death and rebirth, (Note: Paul Williams: "All rebirth is due to karma and is impermanent. Short of attaining enlightenment, in each rebirth one is born and dies, to be reborn elsewhere in accordance with the completely impersonal causal nature of one's own karma. The endless cycle of birth, rebirth, and redeath, is samsara."). In the Dhammacakkappavattana Sutta, the Buddha describes birth, aging, illness, death, association with the unpleasant, separation from the pleasant, and not getting what one desires as dukkha; "in conclusion", the five aggregates of attachment (khandhas) are dukkha. Jonathan C. Gold notes that "unreliable" ('precarious') as translation for dukhka makes better sense of this list, as all of these are "unavoidable, unpredictable things", out of our control.

Buddhist teachings emphasise developing insight into the nature of dukkha, and describe how sense-contact give rise to feelings, which can lead to clinging and craving and contribute to suffering and rebirth. This is summarized in the teachings on the Four Noble Truths, which describe the origin and cessation of suffering.

The Buddhist tradition also distinguishes three types of dukkha:

- Dukkha-dukkha, pain or suffering in its ordinary sense.
- Viparinama-dukkha, the suffering of change, as even happiness is subject to change.
- Sankhara-dukkha, the suffering of conditioned existence, which is part of being unenlightened in a conditioned world.

=== Chinese Buddhism ===
Chinese Buddhist tradition has been influenced by Taoism and Confucian theory that advocates that duhkha (古:十Ten directions, 口 hole or opening) is associated to the theory of seven emotions of endogenous disease through the formation of the spirit of the po a term that relates to the Western psychological notion of ego or the theological reference to the human soul. This theory is expounded in the application of traditional Chinese medicine through the theory of Shen for the treatment and prevention of pain and suffering from illness, disease and ignorance.

== Hinduism ==
In Hinduism, duḥkha encompasses many meanings such as the phenomenological senses of pain and grief, a deep-seated dissatisfaction with the limitations of worldly existence, and the devastation of impermanence.

In Hindu scriptures, the earliest Upaniṣads – the Bṛhadāraṇyaka and the Chāndogya – in all likelihood predate the advent of Buddhism. (Note: See, e.g., Patrick Olivelle (1996), Upaniṣads (Oxford: Oxford University Press), ISBN 978-0-19-283576-5, p. xxxvi: "The scholarly consensus, well-founded I think, is that the Bṛhadāraṇyaka and the Chāndogya are the two earliest Upaniṣads. ... The two texts as we have them are, in all likelihood, pre-Buddhist; placing them in the seventh to sixth centuries BCE may be reasonable, give or take a century or so.") In these scriptures of Hinduism, the Sanskrit word duḥkha (दुःख) appears in the sense of "suffering, sorrow, distress", and in the context of a spiritual pursuit and liberation through the knowledge of Atman ('essence'). They discuss that suffering occurs due to ignorance, which leads to one being bound in this world.

The concept of sorrow and suffering, and self-knowledge as a means to overcome it, appears extensively with other terms in the pre-Buddhist Upanishads. The term Duhkha also appears in many other middle and later post-Buddhist Upanishads such as the verse 6.20 of Shvetashvatara Upanishad, as well as in the Bhagavad Gita, all in the contexts of moksha and bhakti. (Note: See Bhagavad Gita verses 2.56, 5.6, 6.22-32, 8.15, 10.4, 13.6-8, 14.16, 17.9, 18.8, etc.)

The term also appears in the foundational Sutras of the six schools of Hindu philosophy, such as the opening lines of Samkhya karika of the Samkhya school. (Note: Original Sanskrit: Samkhya karika Compiled and indexed by Ferenc Ruzsa (2015), Sanskrit Documents Archives. Second translation (Verse 1): Ferenc Ruzsa (1997), "The triple suffering - A note on the Samkhya karika", Xth World Sanskrit Conference: Bangalore, University of Hungary, Budapest. Third translation (all verses): John Davis (translator), Samkhyakarika of Iswara Krishna, London: Trübner, University of Toronto Archives.) The Samkhya school identifies three types of suffering. The Samkhya karika begins with the inquiry into the means of overcoming these types of suffering. It considers ordinary remedies such as medicine and scriptural remedies as insufficient to end suffering permanently, and identifies knowledge of the unmanifest (prakriti), manifest world, and knower (purusha) as the means to liberation.

The Yoga Sutras of Patanjali state that "for one who has discrimination, everything is suffering" (duḥkham eva sarvaṁ vivekinaḥ). The Yoga Sutras also describe aversion (dvesha) as arising from past experiences of suffering and state that clinging to life (abhinivesha) "affects even the wise", which commentators associate with fear of death and impressions from previous lives.

Some of the Hindu scripture verses referring to duhkha are:

Hindu scripture	Sanskrit	English
Bṛhadāraṇyaka Upaniṣad (Verse 4.4.14)	ihaiva santo 'tha vidmas tad vayaṃ na ced avedir mahatī vinaṣṭiḥ ye tad vidur amṛtās te bhavanty athetare duḥkham evāpiyanti	While we are still here, we have come to know it [ātman]. If you've not known it, great is your destruction. Those who have known it – they become immortal. As for the rest – only suffering awaits them.
Chāndogya Upaniṣad (Verse 7.26.2)	na paśyo mṛtyuṃ paśyati na rogaṃ nota duḥkhatām sarvaṃ ha paśyaḥ paśyati sarvam āpnoti sarvaśaḥ	When a man rightly sees, he sees no death, no sickness or distress. (Note: Max Muller translates Duḥkhatām in this verse as "pain".) When a man rightly sees, he sees all, he wins all, completely. (Note: This statement is comparable to the Pali Canon's Dhammacakkappavattana Sutta (SN 56.11) where sickness and death are identified as examples of dukkha.)
Bhagavad Gita (Verse 2.56)	duḥkheṣhv-anudvigna-manāḥ sukheṣhu vigata-spṛihaḥ vīta-rāga-bhaya-krodhaḥ sthita-dhīr munir uchyate	One whose mind remains undisturbed amidst misery, who does not crave for pleasure, and who is free from attachment, fear, and anger, is called a sage of steady wisdom.
Bhagavad Gita (Verse 8.15)	mām upetya punar janma duḥkhālayam aśāśvatam nāpnuvanti mahātmānaḥ saṁsiddhiṁ paramāṁ gatāḥ	Reaching me, these great souls never again experience birth in this temporal abode of misery, for they have attained the ultimate perfection.

== Jainism ==
In Jain philosophy, duhkha is understood as a direct consequence of karma binding to the soul through activity motivated by passion. Liberation from this bondage, and thus from duhkha, is achieved through the right worldview (samyagdarśana), right knowledge, and right conduct, culminating in the cessation of karmic influx.

Duḥkha is explained in the Tattvartha Sutra, an authoritative Jain scripture from the 2nd century.

Sanskrit

samyagdarśanaśuddhaṃ yo jñānaṃ viratim eva cāpnoti
duḥkhanimittam apīdaṃ tena sulabdhaṃ bhavati janma

Translation:
English

[For] him who obtains knowledge, which is pure through right worldview, and indeed non-passion,
for him there is good birth, even though this is the cause of pain.

== See also ==
- Existential despair
- Four Noble Truths
- Nirodha
- Noble Eightfold Path
- Pathos
- Samudaya
- The Sickness Unto Death
- Suffering
- Sukha
- Taṇhā

== Sources ==
- Alexander, James (2019), "The State Is the Attempt to Strip Metaphor Out of Politics", in Kos, Eric S. (ed.), Michael Oakeshott on Authority, Governance, and the State, Springer
- Analayo (2013), Satipatthana. The Direct Path to Realization (PDF), Windhorse Publications
- Anderson, Carol (2013). Pain and Its Ending: The Four Noble Truths in the Theravada Buddhist Canon. Routledge. ISBN 978-1-136-81332-0.
- Beckwith, Christopher I. (2015). Greek Buddha: Pyrrho's Encounter with Early Buddhism in Central Asia (PDF). Princeton University Press. ISBN 9781400866328.
- Bhikkhu Bodhi (2011), The Noble Eightfold Path: Way to the End of Suffering, Independent Publishers Group, Kindle Edition
- Bryant, Edwin (2009). The Yoga Sutras of Patanjali. North Point Press. ISBN 978-0865477360.
- Dalai Lama (1998), The Four Noble Truths, Thorsons
- Gethin, Rupert (1998), Foundations of Buddhism, Oxford University Press
- Gold, Jonathan C. (2023). "Pyrrho's Buddha on Duḥkha and the Liberation from Views". Journal of the American Academy of Religion, Volume 91, Issue 3, September 2023, Pages 655–679.
- Goldstein, Joseph (2013), Mindfulness: A Practical Guide to Awakening, Sounds True, Kindle Edition
- Harvey, Peter (2013). The Selfless Mind: Personality, Consciousness and Nirvana in Early Buddhism. Routledge. ISBN 978-1-136-78336-4.
- Harvey, Peter (2015). "Dukkha, Non-Self, and the Teaching on the Four Noble Truths". In Emmanuel, Steven M. (ed.). A Companion to Buddhist Philosophy. John Wiley & Sons. ISBN 978-1-119-14466-3.
- Huxter, Malcolm (2016). Healing the Heart and Mind with Mindfulness: Ancient Path, Present Moment. Routledge. ISBN 978-1-317-50540-2.
- Kelly, Brendan (2026). "Dukkha in the Age of Algorithms: Why We Feel Uneasy". Psychology Today.
- Keown, Damien (2000), Buddhism: A Very Short Introduction, Oxford University Press, Kindle Edition
- Keown, Damien (2003), Dictionary of Buddhism, Oxford University Press, ISBN 0-19-860560-9
- Monier-Williams, Monier (1899), A Sanskrit-English Dictionary (PDF), London: Oxford University Press
- Nyanatiloka Thera (2004). "dukkha". Buddhist Dictionary: Manual of Buddhist Terms and Doctrines (5 ed.). Kandy: Buddhist Publication Society. ISBN 9789552400193.
- Prebish, Charles (1993), Historical Dictionary of Buddhism, The Scarecrow Press, ISBN 0-8108-2698-4
- Rhys Davids, Thomas William; Stede, William (1921). Pali-English Dictionary. Motilal Banarsidass. ISBN 978-81-208-1144-7.
- Sargeant, Winthrop (2009), The Bhagavad Gita, SUNY Press
- Smith, Huston; Novak, Philip (2009), Buddhism: A Concise Introduction, HarperOne, Kindle Edition
- Walpola Rahula (2007), What the Buddha Taught, Grove Press, Kindle Edition
- Williams, Paul (2000), Buddhist Thought, Routledge, ISBN 0-415207010
