= Index of Buddhism-related articles =

Alphabetical listing of Buddhism related topics

== 0–9 ==
- 22 Vows of Ambedkar

== A ==
- Abhayagiri Buddhist Monastery
- Abhayamudra
- Abhibhavayatana
- Abhidhajamahāraṭṭhaguru
- Abhidhamma
- Abhidhamma Pitaka
- Abhidharmadīpa
- Abhidharmakośa-bhāsya
- Abhijatabhivamsa
- Abhijna
- Abhirati
- Abhutaparikalpa
- Acala
- Acariya
- Access to Insight
- Achar (Buddhism)
- Acharya Buddharakkhita
- Adam's Peak
- Adhiṭṭhāna
- Adhimokṣa
- Adi-Buddha
- Ādittapariyāya Sutta
- Āgama
- Āgama Section
- Agga Maha Pandita
- Aggañña Sutta
- Aggavamsa
- Aggi-Vacchagotta Sutta
- Ahimsa
- Ajahn
- Ajahn Amaro
- Ajahn Brahmavaṃso
- Ajahn Candasiri
- Ajahn Chah Subhaddo
- Ajahn Chanda Thawaro
- Ajahn Dune Atulo
- Ajahn Fuang Jotiko
- Ajahn Jayasāro
- Ajahn Khemadhammo
- Ajahn Lee Dhammadharo
- Ajahn Maha Bua
- Ajahn Mun Bhuridatta
- Ajahn Pasanno
- Ajahn Sao Kantasilo Mahathera
- Ajahn Sobin S. Namto
- Ajahn Sucitto
- Ajahn Sujato
- Ajahn Sumedho
- Ajahn Sundara
- Ajahn Suwat Suvaco
- Ajahn Thate Desaransi
- Ajahn Tong Sirimangalo
- Ajahn Viradhammo
- Ajanta Caves
- Ajari
- Ajatasattu
- Akasagarbha
- Aksobhya
- Āḷāra Kālāma
- Alayavijnana
- Alexandra David-Néel
- Alodawpyi Pagoda
- Aluvihare Rock Temple
- Amarapura Nikaya
- Amarapura–Rāmañña Nikāya
- Amara Sinha
- Amaravati Buddhist Monastery
- Amaravati Stupa
- Ambagahawatte Indrasabhawara Gnanasami Maha Thera
- Ambapali
- Ambedkar
- Amitabha
- Amitabha Sutra
- Amoghasiddhi
- Ampitiye Rahula Maha Thera
- Anāgāmi
- Anagarika
- Anagarika Dharmapala
- Anagarika Munindra
- Anawrahta
- Ananda
- Ananda College
- Ananda Maitreya
- Ananda Temple
- Ananda W.P. Guruge
- Anantarika-karma
- Ānāpānasati
- Ānāpānasati Sutta
- Buddhist anarchism
- Anathapindika
- Anattā
- Anattalakkhaṇa Sutta
- Anaukchaung Dvāra Gaing
- Angkor Wat
- Ango
- Aṅgulimāla
- Angulimaliya Sutra
- Anguttara Nikaya
- Angya
- Anicca
- Aniconism in Buddhism
- Animals in Buddhism
- Aniruddha Mahathera
- Añjali Mudrā
- Annam Nikaya of Thailand
- Anne Hopkins Aitken
- Anomadassi Buddha
- An Shigao
- Antaravasaka
- Anunatva-Apurnatva-Nirdesa
- Anupitaka
- Anupubbikathā
- Anuradhapura
- Anuruddha
- Anussati
- An Xuan
- Apadāna
- Arahant
- Arahant Upatissa
- Buddhist architecture
- Art and architecture of Japan
- Aruna Ratanagiri Buddhist Monastery
- Arūpajhāna
- Aryadeva
- Asalha Puja
- Asaṃkhyeya
- Āsava
- Aśvaghoṣa
- Asanga
- Ascetic
- Ashin Dhammasāmi
- Ashin Jinarakkhita
- Ashin Nandamalabhivamsa
- Ashin Sandadika
- Ashin Thittila
- Ashoka
- Ashoka Chakra
- Ashokan Edicts in Delhi
- Asokaramaya Buddhist Temple
- Ashokavadana
- Asita
- Assaji
- Asura (Buddhism)
- Atamasthana
- Āṭānāṭiya Sutta
- Atisha
- Atman (Buddhism)
- Atthakatha
- Aṭṭhakavagga and Pārāyanavagga
- Atthasālinī
- Atumashi Monastery
- Aung Zabu Monastery
- Aurangabad Caves
- Avadanasataka
- Avalokitesvara
- Avalokiteshvara of Chaiya
- Avatamsaka Sutra
- Avici
- Avijjā
- Awgatha
- Āyatana
- Ayutthaya
- Ayya Khema

== B ==
- Bagan
- Bagaya Monastery
- Bairat Temple
- Bai Sema
- Baizhang Huaihai
- Bala (Buddhism)
- Bamyan Buddhas
- Balangoda Ananda Maitreya Thero
- Bangasayusang
- Bangladesh Bauddha Kristi Prachar Sangha
- Banishment of Buddhist monks from Nepal
- Bankei Yōtaku
- Baochang (monk)
- Bupaya Pagoda
- Bardo
- Barre Center for Buddhist Studies
- Barua Buddhist Institutes in India and Bangladesh
- Basic points unifying Theravāda and Mahāyāna
- Bassui Tokushō
- Batuo
- Bauddha Rishi Mahapragya
- Bedse Caves
- Bell tower (wat)
- Bengal Buddhist Association
- Bengali Buddhists
- Benhuan
- Benimadhab Barua
- Berenike Buddha
- Bezeklik Thousand Buddha Caves
- Bhadant Anand Kausalyayan
- Bhadda Kapilani
- Bhadda Kundalakesa
- Bhaisajyaguru
- Bhaja Caves
- Bhante
- Bhante Sujato
- Bhava
- Bhavacakra
- Bhavana
- Bhavanga
- Bhāvaviveka
- Bhikkhu
- Bhikkhu Analayo
- Bhikkhu Bodhi
- Bhikkhuni
- Bhumchu
- Bhumi
- Bīja
- Bimaran casket
- Bimbisara
- Birken Forest Buddhist Monastery
- Bishuddhananda Mahathera
- Bizhu
- Black Crown
- Bo Bo Gyi
- Bodh Gaya
- Bodh Gaya bombings
- Bodhgaya inscription of Mahanaman
- Bodhi
- Bodhicitta
- Bodhi Day
- Bodhidharma
- Bodhimanda
- Bodhin Kjolhede
- Bodhinyana Monastery
- Bodhipakkhiyādhammā
- Bodhiruci
- Bodhisattva
  - Maitreya
- Bodhisattvacaryāvatāra
- Bodhisattva vows
- Bodhi tree
- Bodhi Vamsa
- Bojjhanga
- Bön
- Bon Festival
- Borobudur
- Borobudur bombing (1985)
- Botataung Pagoda
- Boudhanath
- Bour Kry
- Brahma
- Brahmajāla Sutta
- Brahma's Net Sutra
- Brahma-viharas
- Brussels Buddha
- Budai
- Buddha
- Buddha's Birthday
- Buddhacarita
- Buddha Collapsed out of Shame
- Buddhadasa Bhikkhu
- Buddhadharma: The Practitioner's Quarterly
- Buddha Dharma wa Nepal Bhasa
- Buddha Dhatu Jadi
- Buddha Dordenma statue
- Buddha footprint
- Buddhaghosa
- Buddhaghosa Mahasthavir
- Buddhahood
- Buddha images in Thailand
- Buddha Jayanti Park
- Buddha-nature
- Buddhānussati
- Buddhapālita
- Buddha Preaching his First Sermon (Sarnath)
- Buddha Sāsana Nuggaha
- Buddha statue
- Buddhavacana
- Buddhavamsa
- Buddhayaśas
- Buddhism- three branches: Theravada, Mahayana, Vajrayana
- Buddhism and Eastern religions
- Buddhism and evolution
- Buddhism and Hinduism
- Buddhism and Jainism
- Buddhism and psychology
- Buddhism and science
- Buddhism and sexual orientation
- Buddhism and sexuality
- Buddhism and the body
- Buddhism and Theosophy
- Buddhism and the Roman world
  - Buddhism by region
    - Buddhism in Central Asia
    - Buddhism in Southeast Asia
    - East Asian Buddhism
    - Buddhism in the Middle East
    - Buddhism in the West
      - Buddhism in Africa
      - Buddhism in the Americas
      - Buddhism in Australia
      - Buddhism in Europe
  - Buddhism by country
    - Buddhism in Afghanistan
    - Buddhism in Argentina
    - Buddhism in Armenia
    - Buddhism in Australia
    - Buddhism in Austria
    - Buddhism in Bangladesh
    - Buddhism in Belgium
    - Buddhism in Belarus
    - Buddhism in Belize
    - Buddhism in Bhutan
    - Buddhism in Brazil
    - Buddhism in Brunei
    - Buddhism in Bulgaria
    - Buddhism in Cambodia
    - Buddhism in Canada
    - Buddhism in China
    - Buddhism in Costa Rica
    - Buddhism in Croatia
    - Buddhism in Czech Republic
    - Buddhism in Denmark
    - Buddhism in Estonia
    - Buddhism in El Salvador
    - Buddhism in Finland
    - Buddhism in France
    - Buddhism in Germany
    - Buddhism in Greece
    - Buddhism in Guatemala
    - Buddhism in Honduras
    - Buddhism in Hong Kong
    - Buddhism in Iceland
    - Buddhism in India
      - Buddhism in Himachal Pradesh
      - Buddhism in Kashmir
      - Buddhism in Kerala
    - Buddhism in Indonesia
    - Buddhism in Iran
    - Buddhism in Israel
    - Buddhism in Italy
    - Buddhism in Japan
    - Buddhism in Korea
    - Buddhism in Laos
    - Buddhism in Libya
    - Buddhism in Liechtenstein
    - Buddhism in Malaysia
    - Buddhism in Maldives
    - Buddhism in Mexico
    - Buddhism in Mongolia
    - Buddhism in Morocco
    - Buddhism in Myanmar
    - Buddhism in Nepal
    - Buddhism in the Netherlands
    - Buddhism in New Zealand
    - Buddhism in Nicaragua
    - Buddhism in Norway
    - Buddhism in Pakistan
    - Buddhism in Panama
    - Buddhism in the Philippines
    - Buddhism in Poland
    - Buddhism in Reunion
    - Buddhism in Russia
      - Buddhism in Kalmykia
      - Buddhism in Buryatia
    - Buddhism in Saudi Arabia
    - Buddhism in Senegal
    - Buddhism in Singapore
    - Buddhism in Spain
    - Buddhism in Slovakia
    - Buddhism in Slovenia
    - Buddhism in South Africa
    - Buddhism in Sri Lanka
    - Buddhism in Sweden
    - Buddhism in Switzerland
    - Buddhism in Taiwan
    - Buddhism in Thailand
    - Buddhism in Turkey
    - Buddhism in Ukraine
    - Buddhism in the United Kingdom
      - Buddhism in England
      - Buddhism in Scotland
      - Buddhism in Wales
    - Buddhism in the United States
    - Buddhism in Venezuela
    - Buddhism in Vietnam
- Buddhism in the West
- Buddhist atomism
- Buddhist art
  - Sacred art
  - Greco-Buddhist Art
- Buddhist Canons
- Buddhist caves in India
- Buddhist clergy
- Buddhist cosmology
- Buddhist Councils
  - First Buddhist council
  - Second Buddhist council
  - Third Buddhist council
  - Fourth Buddhist council
  - Fifth Buddhist council
  - Sixth Buddhist council
- Buddhist cuisine
- Buddhist Cultural Centre
- Buddhist devotion
- Buddhist economics
- Buddhist eschatology
- Buddhist ethics
- Buddhist flag
- Buddhist Global Relief
- Buddhist Hybrid English
- Buddhist Hybrid Sanskrit
- Buddhist Institute (Cambodia)
- Buddhist kingship
- Buddhist Maha Vihara, Brickfields
- Buddhist meditation
- Buddhist music
- Buddhist orders
- Buddhist paths to liberation
- Buddhist Peace Fellowship
- Buddhist philosophy
- Buddhist pilgrimage sites in Nepal
- Buddhist Publication Society
- Buddhist sects in Myanmar
- Buddhist socialism
- Buddhist symbolism
- Buddhist terms and concepts
- Buddhist texts
- Buddhist vegetarianism
- Buddhist views of homosexuality
- Buddhist views on sin
- Buddhology
- Bulguksa
- Buner reliefs
- Burmese Buddhist Temple (Singapore)
- Burmese Buddhist titles
- Burmese pagoda
- Busabok
- Byōdō-in

== C ==
- Caitika
- Cakkavaladipani
- Cakrasaṃvara Tantra
- Buddhist calendar
- Cāmadevivaṃsa
- Candi of Indonesia
  - Candi Bahal
  - Candi Banyunibo
  - Candi Bubrah
  - Candi Jabung
  - Candi Kalibening
  - Candi Lumbung
  - Candi Mendut
  - Candi Ngawen
  - Candi Pawon
  - Candi Plaosan
  - Candi Sari
  - Candi Sewu
  - Candi Sojiwan
- Candrakīrti
- Candraprabha
- Caodong school
- Cariyapitaka
- Cetanā
- Cetiya
- Chagdud Tulku Rinpoche
- Chaitya
- Chaitya Bhoomi
- Chak Phra
- Champasak Sangha College
- Chan
- Chanda (Buddhism)
- Chandra Khonnokyoong
- Chan Khong
- Chanmyay Sayadaw
- Channa
- Chanting
- Charles Hallisey
- Charles Henry Allan Bennett
- Charumati Stupa
- Sherry Chayat
- Chedi Phukhao Thong
- Cheng Yen
- Cheontae
- Cheri Huber
- Chi Chern
- Chinese Buddhism
- Chinese Buddhist canon
- Chinese Esoteric Buddhism
- Chinese Sangha of Thailand
- Chithurst Buddhist Monastery
- Chittadhar Hridaya
- Chittagong Pali College
- Chöd
- Chofa
- Chögyam Trungpa
- Chorten
- Chotrul Duchen
- Buddhist influences on Christianity
- Buddhism and Christianity
- Christmas Humphreys
- Chuon Nath
- Citta
- Citta (disciple)
- Cittasubho
- Clinging
- Commentaries
- Compassion
- Concentration
- Conceptual Proliferation
- Consciousness
- Consciousness-only
- Contact
- Contemplation Sutra
- Craving
- Creator in Buddhism
- Buddhist cuisine
- Culavamsa
- Cultural elements of Buddhism
- Culture of Bhutan
- Culture of Myanmar
- Cunda

== D ==
- Dagpo Kagyu
- Dahui Zonggao
- Dai Bai Zan Cho Bo Zen Ji
- Dainin Katagiri
- Dakini
- Dalai Lama
  - 1st Dalai Lama
  - 2nd Dalai Lama
  - 3rd Dalai Lama
  - 4th Dalai Lama
  - 5th Dalai Lama
  - 6th Dalai Lama
  - 7th Dalai Lama
  - 8th Dalai Lama
  - 9th Dalai Lama
  - 10th Dalai Lama
  - 11th Dalai Lama
  - 12th Dalai Lama
  - 13th Dalai Lama
  - 14th Dalai Lama
- Dalit Buddhist movement
- Daman Hongren
- Dambulla cave temple
- Dāna
- Danka system
- Daoji
- Daoxuan
- Daranagama Kusaladhamma Thero
- Dark retreat
- Dasabodhisattuppattikatha
- Dasa sil mata
- Das Buddhistische Haus
- Dashabhumika
- Dāṭhavaṃsa
- David Kalupahana
- Davuldena Gnanissara Thero
- Daw Mya Thwin
- Dayi Daoxin
- Dazu Huike
- Death
- Decline of Buddhism in India
- Decline of the Dharma
- Deekshabhoomi
- Defilements
- Delgamuwa Raja Maha Vihara
- Dependent Origination
- Depictions of Gautama Buddha in film
- Desire realm
- Deva
- Devadaha
- Devadatta
- Devanampiya Tissa of Anuradhapura
- Development of Karma in Buddhism
- Devotion
- Dhamek Stupa
- Dhammacakkappavattana Sutta
- Dhammachakra Pravartan Day
- Dhamma Joti Vipassana Meditation Center
- Dhammakaya meditation
- Dhammakaya Movement
- Dhammakaya Tradition UK
- Dhammalok Mahasthavir
- Dhammananda Bhikkhuni
- Dhammapada
- Dhammapāla
- Dhammarakkhita
- Dhammasangani
- Dhammasattha
- The Dhamma Brothers
- Dhamma Society Fund
- Dhamma vicaya
- Dhammayangyi Temple
- Dhammayazika Pagoda
- Dhammayietra
- Dhammayuttika Nikaya
- Dhammazedi
- Dhammika Sutta
- Dhammikarama Burmese Temple
- Dharani
- Dhardo Rimpoche
- Dharma/Dhamma
- Dharmacakra
- Dharmachari Guruma
- Dharma character school
- Dharmadhatu
- Dharmaditya Dharmacharya
- Dharmaguptaka
- Dharmakaya
- Dharmakirti
- Dharmakīrtiśrī
- Dharmakṣema
- Dharmapala
- Dharmaraja College
- Dharmarajika Stupa
- Dharmarakṣa
- Dharmaraksita
- Dharma Seed
- Dharmaskandha
- Dharma centre
- Dharma talk
- Dharma transmission
- Dharmodaya
- Dhatu
- Dhatukatha
- Dhatukaya
- Dhauli
- Dhṛtarāṣṭra
- Dhutanga
- Dhyānabhadra
- Dhyāna in Buddhism
- Diamond Realm
- Diamond Sutra
- Diamond Way Buddhism
- Dighajanu Sutta
- Digha Nikaya
- Dignāga
- Dipa Ma
- Dipankara
- Dīpavaṃsa
- Dirgha Agama
- Disciple or Hearer
- Divyavadana
- Diyawadana Nilame
- Dōgen
- Doing Time, Doing Vipassana
- Dōkyō
- Dolpopa Sherab Gyaltsen
- Dona Sutta
- Donchee
- Dongshan Liangjie
- Drikung Kagyu
- Drukpa Lineage
- Drupka Teshi
- Dudjom Rinpoche
- Dukkha
- dvesha
- Dzogchen

== E ==
- Early Buddhist schools
- Early Buddhist texts
- East Asian Buddhism
- Ecclesiastical peerage of Thailand
- Edicts of Ashoka
- Edward Conze
- Effort
- Eido Tai Shimano
- Eight auspicious symbols
- Eight Garudhammas
- Eight Great Events
- Eindawya Pagoda
- Eisai
- Ekaggata
- Ekayana Monastery bombing (2013)
- Ekavyahāraka
- Ekottara Āgama
- Ellora Caves
- Mount Emei
- Emerald Buddha
- Emptiness
- Engaku-ji
- Energy
- Engaged Buddhism
- Enlightenment in Buddhism
- Equanimity
- Ernest Reinhold Rost
- Esala Mangallaya
- Esala Perahera
- Buddhist eschatology
- Eternal Buddha
- Buddhist ethics
- Buddhist Ethics (discipline)

== F ==
- Faith in Buddhism
- Family of Gautama Buddha
- Faxian
- Fayun
- Fazang
- Feeling
- Festival of Floral Offerings
- Filial piety in Buddhism
- Fire Sermon
- Five Aggregates
- Five Hindrances
- Five Precepts
- Five Spiritual Faculties
- Five Strengths
- Five Wisdom Buddhas
- Five Wisdoms
- Fo Guang Shan
- Fo Guang Shan Buddha Museum
- Foguang Temple (Mangshi)
- Folding-book manuscripts
- Footprint of the Buddha
- Forest Tradition of Ajahn Chah
- Form
- Formations
- Fotudeng
- Four Buddhist Persecutions in China
- Four Dharmadhātu
- Four Divine Abidings
- Four Great Elements
- Four Heavenly Kings
- Four Noble Truths
- Four Right Exertions
- Four sights
- Four stages of enlightenment
- Four-Storied Monastery
- Fourteen unanswerable questions
- Frank Lee Woodward
- Frank Ostaseski
- Friedrich Lustig
- Friends of the Western Buddhist Order
- Gil Fronsdal
- Fuju-fuse
- Fuke Zen

== G ==
- Gadaw
- Gawdawpalin Temple
- Gal Vihara
- Gampopa
- Gandhara
- Gandharan Buddhism
- Gandharan Buddhist texts
- Gandharva
- Ganden Tripa
- Gangaramaya Temple
- Garab Dorje
- Gatbawi
- Gautama Buddha
- Gautama Buddha in world religions
- Gavāṃpati
- Gaya
- Geji Ajahn
- Gelukpa
- Gempo Yamamoto
- Generosity
- Geshe
- Geumdong Mireuk Bosal Bangasang
- Gihwa
- Girihandu Seya
- Global Buddhist Network
- Global Buddhist Summit
- Global Vipassana Pagoda
- Glossary of Buddhism
- Gnosticism and Buddhism
- God in Buddhism
- S. N. Goenka
- Golden Buddha (statue)
- Golden Light Sutra
- Golden Pagoda, Namsai
- Golulaka
- Gradual training
- Great Buddha (Bodh Gaya)
- Great Buddha of Thailand
- Great Renunciation
- Great Tang Records on the Western Regions
- Greco-Buddhism
- Greco-Buddhist art
- Greco-Buddhist monasticism
- Gregory Paul Kramer
- Guan Yin
- Guang Qin
- Gubyaukgyi Temple (Myinkaba)
- Guntupalli Group of Buddhist Monuments

== H ==
- Hachiman
- Haeinsa
- Haibutsu kishaku
- Hajime Nakamura
- Hakuin Ekaku
- Haku'un Yasutani
- Ryushin Paul Haller
- Hall of Four Heavenly Kings
- Hall of Guanyin
- Hall of Guru
- Hall of Kshitigarbha
- Hall of Sangharama Palace
- Hammalawa Saddhatissa
- Hamsa
- Han Yong-un
- Happiness
- Harada Daiun Sogaku
- Hariti
- Hatadage
- Hatthaka of Alavi
- Heart Sutra
- Heaven
- Helgö Buddha
- Hell
- Henepola Gunaratana
- Heng Sure
- Henry Steel Olcott
- Heresy in Buddhism
- Hermann Hesse
- Higher evolution
- Hikkaduwe Sri Sumangala Thera
- Hinayana
- Hiranya Varna Mahavihar
- History of Buddhism
- History of Buddhism in Cambodia
- History of Buddhism in India
- History of Buddhism in India and Tibet
- History of the Thai Forest Tradition
- History of Theravada Buddhism
- Hngettwin Gaing
- Hōjōki
- Buddhist holidays
- Hōnen
- Hong Choon
- Hong Kong Buddhist Association
- Hong Kong Buddhist Hospital
- Hong Yi
- Honpa Hongwanji Mission of Hawaii
- Ho trai
- Houn Jiyu-Kennett
- Householder
- Hsinbyume Pagoda
- Hsi Lai Temple
- Hsing Yun
- Hsuan Hua
- Hsu Yun
- Htilin Monastery
- Htilominlo Temple
- Htupayon Pagoda
- Huangbo Xiyun
- Huayan school
- Hugo Enomiya-Lassalle
- Huichang Persecution of Buddhism
- Dajian Huineng
- Human beings in Buddhism
- Humanistic Buddhism
- Huot Tat
- Hwaom
- Hyakumantō Darani
- Hyecho

== I ==
- Icchantika
- I Ching (monk)
- Iconography of Gautama Buddha in Laos and Thailand
- Iddhi
- Iddhipada
- Ignorance
- Daisaku Ikeda
- Ikkō-shū
- Ikkyū
- Imakita Kosen
- Impermanence
- Indonesian Esoteric Buddhism
- Indrasala Cave
- Indriya
- Infinite Life Sutra
- Ingen
- Innumerable Meanings Sutra
- Insight
- Insight Meditation Society
- International Buddhist College
- International Buddhist Museum
- International Buddhist Studies College
- International Congress on Buddhist Women's Role in the Sangha
- International Meditation Centre
- International Network of Engaged Buddhists
- International Theravada Buddhist Missionary University
- Ippen
- Isaline Blew Horner
- Island Hermitage
- Issan Dorsey
- Itivuttaka

== J ==
- Jack Kornfield
- Jai Bhim
- Jainism and Buddhism
- Jakuen
- Jakushitsu Genkō
- Jakusho Kwong
- James Ishmael Ford
- Jamgon Kongtrul
- Jana Baha Dyah Jatra
- Jana bahal
- Jarāmaraṇa
- Jataka tales
- Jāti (Buddhism)
- Jaya Sri Maha Bodhi
- Jetavana
- Jetavanaramaya
- Jetsundamba
- Jhāna
- Jianzhi Sengcan
- Jinakalamali
- Jinapañjara
- Jinul
- Jisha
- Mount Jiuhua
- Jizang
- Jnanagupta
- Jnanaprasthana
- Jnanasutra
- Jnanayasas
- Joanna Macy
- Jodo Shinshu
- Jōdo shū
- John Crook
- John Daido Loori
- John Garrie
- John Tarrant
- Jokhang
- Joko Beck
- Jonang
- Joseph Goldstein
- Jukai
- Jyotipal Mahathero

== K ==
- Kaba Aye Pagoda
- Kadampa
- Kadawedduwe Jinavamsa Mahathera
- Kagyu
- Kaibao Canon
- Kaichō
- Mount Kailash
- Kakusandha
- Kalachakra
- Kalama Sutta
- Kalpa (aeon)
- Kalu Rinpoche
- Kalyāṇa-mittatā
- Kalyani Inscriptions
- Kalyani Ordination Hall
- Kāma
- Kamalapur Dharmarajika Bauddha Vihara
- Kamalaśīla
- Kammapatha
- Kammaṭṭhāna
- Kandahar Bilingual Rock Inscription
- Kandahar Greek Edicts of Ashoka
- Kandy Esala Perahera
- Kangan Giin
- Kang Senghui
- Kangyur
- Kanheri Caves
- Kanishka
- Kanishka casket
- Kanishka Stupa
- Kanthaka
- Kapilavatthu
- Kappiya
- Kargah Buddha
- Karla Caves
- Karl Eugen Neumann
- Karma / Kamma
- Karma in Tibetan Buddhism
- Karma Kagyu
- Karmapa
  - 1st Karmapa
  - 2nd Karmapa
  - 3rd Karmapa
  - 4th Karmapa
  - 5th Karmapa
  - 6th Karmapa
  - 7th Karmapa
  - 8th Karmapa
  - 9th Karmapa
  - 10th Karmapa
  - 11th Karmapa
  - 12th Karmapa
  - 13th Karmapa
  - 14th Karmapa
  - 15th Karmapa
  - 16th Karmapa
  - 17th Karmapa (Ogyen Trinley Dorje)
  - 17th Karmapa (Trinley Thaye Dorje)
- Karma Thinley Rinpoche
- Karuṇā
- Kasaya (clothing)
- Kasina
- Kassapa Buddha
- Kāśyapīya
- Kathavatthu
- Kathina
- Katukurunde Nyanananda Thera
- Kaunghmudaw Pagoda
- Kawgun Cave
- Kāyagatāsati Sutta
- Kegon
- Keido Fukushima
- Keiji Nishitani
- Keisaku
- Keizan
- Kek Lok Si
- Kelaniya Raja Maha Vihara
- Kensho
- Kesaria stupa
- Kevatta Sutta
- Khaggavisana Sutta
- Khakkhara
- Khandha
- Khandhaka
- Khanti
- Khatha
- Khema
- Khenpo
- Khmer Empire
- Khrua In Khong
- Khruba Apichai Khao Pi
- Khruba Chaiyawong
- Khruba Duangdee Subhadho
- Khruba Khamla Sangwaro
- Khruba Siwichai
- Khuddaka Nikaya
- Khuddakapatha
- Khujjuttarā
- Kilesa
- Kimbell seated Bodhisattva
- Kindo Baha
- Kinhin
- Kiribathgoda Gnanananda Thero
- Kiri Vehera
- Kisa Gotami
- Kishimojin
- Kitaro Nishida
- K.L. Dhammajoti
- Knowing Buddha
- Koan
- Kodo Sawaki
- Koṇāgamana
- Kondañña
- Korawakgala
- Korean Buddhist sculpture
- Korean Buddhist temples
- Kosambi
- Kothduwa temple
- Kotmale Mahaweli Maha Seya
- Kotugoda Dhammawasa Thero
- Kripasaran Mahathera
- Kruba Chao Kanchano
- Kruba Kasem Khemako
- Ksitigarbha
- Kṣitigarbha Bodhisattva Pūrvapraṇidhāna Sūtra
- K. Sri Dhammananda
- K. Sri Dhammaratana
- Ksudraka Agama
- Kudo Gaing
- Kūkai
- Kulatissa Nanda Jayatilleke
- Kumārajīva
- Kumar Kashyap Mahasthavir
- Kundaung
- Kunjed Gyalpo Tantra
- Kurjey Lhakhang
- Kushinagar
- Kuthodaw Pagoda
- Kyaikhtisaung Pagoda
- Kyaikkhauk Pagoda
- Kyaiktiyo Pagoda
- Kyaung
- Kyaukse elephant dance festival
- Kyauktawgyi Buddha Temple (Mandalay)
- Kyauktawgyi Buddha Temple (Yangon)
- Kyichu Lhakhang
- Kyōzō

== L ==
- Laykyun Sekkya
- Lalitavistara Sutra
- Lama
- Lamrim Yeshe Nyingpo
- Lance Selwyn Cousins
- Lankarama
- Lankavatara Sutra
- Lao Buddhist sculpture
- Larry Rosenberg
- Lawkananda Pagoda
- Lay follower
- Ledi Sayadaw
- Lhabab Duchen
- Liangqing (monk)
- Liberation Rite of Water and Land
- Life release
- Lineage
- Linji school
- Linji Yixuan
- Lion Capital of Ashoka
- List of Bodhisattvas
- List of Buddha claimants
- List of Buddhas
- List of Buddhist temples
  - List of Buddhist temples in Japan
    - List of Buddhist temples in Kyoto
  - List of Buddhist temples in Thailand
  - List of Buddhist temples in Myanmar
  - List of Buddhist temples in Cambodia
  - List of Buddhist temples in the United States
  - List of Buddhist temples in Singapore
  - List of Buddhist temples in Canada
  - List of Buddhist temples in Malaysia
  - List of Buddhist temples in Indonesia
  - List of Buddhist temples in India
  - List of Buddhist temples in Bhutan
  - List of Buddhist temples in Mongolia
  - List of Buddhist temples in Bangladesh
- List of Buddhists
  - List of American Buddhists
  - List of British Buddhists
  - List of Korean Buddhists
  - List of Marathi Buddhists
  - List of Rinzai Buddhists
- List of converts to Buddhism
- List of converts to Buddhism from Christianity
- List of Dhammakaya branches
- List of Edicts of Ashoka
- List of Mahaviharas of Newar Buddhism
- List of monasteries in Nepal
- List of places where Gautama Buddha stayed
- List of Sāsana Azani recipients
- List of stupas in Nepal
- List of suttas
  - List of Khuddaka Nikaya suttas
  - List of Majjhima Nikaya suttas
- List of the twenty-eight Buddhas
- Lobsang Palden Yeshe
- Lobha
- Lobsang Yeshe
- Buddhist logic
- Lohicca Sutta
- Lokaksema (Buddhist monk)
- Lokesvararaja
- Lokuttaravada
- London Buddhist Vihara
- Longchenpa
- Longmen Grottoes
- Lord Buddha TV
- Loriyan Tangai
- Lotus Sutra
- Loving-kindness
- Luang Pho Chaem
- Luang Phor Daeng Ratto
- Luang Phor Derm Phuttasaro
- Luang Phor Jong Phuttasaro
- Luang Phor Khong Chattamalo
- Luang Phor Ngern Phuttachot
- Luang Phor Nhong Indasuvanno
- Luang Phor Pae Khemangkaro
- Luang Phor Parn Sonanto
- Luang Phor Phat Punyakamo
- Luang Phor Phet
- Luangphor Viriyang Sirintharo
- Luangpho Yai
- Luang Por
- Luang Por Dattajivo
- Luang Por Dhammajayo
- Luang Por Khun Parissuddho
- Luangpor Thong Abhakaro
- Luangphor Viriyang Sirintharo
- Luang Prabang
- Luang Pu Boon Khanthachot
- Luang Pu Chob Thanasamo
- Luang Pu Chuea Piyasilo
- Luang Pu Dee Channo
- Luang Pu Khong Dhammachoto
- Luang Pu Khruang Suphattho
- Luang Pu Phak Thammatatto
- Luang Pu Phat Thitipañño
- Luang Pu Pherm Punyasavano
- Luang Pu Phueak Paññādaro
- Luang Pu Rod Phrommasaro
- Luang Pu Sodh Candasaro
- Luang Pu Suk Kesaro
- Luang Pu Thong Ayana
- Luang Pu Thuat
- Luang Pu Waen Suciṇṇo
- Luipa
- Lumbini
- Lumbini Buddhist University
- Lumbini Development Trust
- Lumbini Natural Park
- Lumbini pillar inscription
- Luminous mind

== M ==
- Madhu Purnima
- Madhyama Āgama
- Mādhyamaka
- Madihe Pannaseeha Thero
- Maechi
- Magha Puja
- Maha Aungmye Bonzan Monastery
- Mahābhūta
- Maha Bodhi Tahtaung
- Mahabodhi Temple
- Mahabodhi Temple, Bagan
- Mahachulalongkornrajavidyalaya University
- Mahadeva
- Mahadharmaraksita
- Mahādvāra Nikāya
- Mahagandhayon Monastery
- Maha Ghosananda
- Maha Kanachan Yen Tek
- Maha Kapphina
- Mahakassapa
- Mahamakut Buddhist University
- Mahamoggallāna
- Mahāmegha Sūtra
- Mahamudra
- Mahamuni Buddha
- Mahanayaka
- Maha Nikaya
- Mahanipata Jataka
- Mahapajapati Gotami
- Mahapanya Vidayalai
- Mahāparinibbāna Sutta
- Mahaparinirvana
- Mahasamghika
- Mahasantisukha Buddha Sasana Center
- Mahasati Meditation
- Mahāsatipaṭṭhāna Sutta
- Mahasiddha
- Mahasi Sayadaw
- Mahasthabir Nikaya
- Mahasthamaprapta
- Mahavamsa
- Mahāvastu
- Mahavihara
- Mahayana
- Mahayana Mahaparinirvana Sutra
- Mahayana sutras
- Mahinda
- Mahinda College
- Mahindarama Buddhist Temple
- Mahisasaka
- Mahiyangana Raja Maha Vihara
- Maitreya
- Majjhantika
- Majjhima Nikāya
- Major Pillar Edicts
- Major Rock Edicts
- Makyo
- Mala
- Manas
- Mandala
- Mandala of the Two Realms
- Mandalay Hill
- Mandarava
- Mangala Sutta
- Mani stone
- Manjusri
- Mañjuśrīmitra
- Manorathapūraṇī
- Mantra
- Manuha Temple
- Mapalagama Wipulasara Maha Thera
- Mara (demon)
- Marathi Buddhists
- Marananta
- Maravijaya attitude
- Marpa Lotsawa
- Buddhist view of marriage
- Masoyein Monastery
- Matara Sri Nanarama Mahathera
- Matter
- Mathura lion capital
- Matteo Pistono
- Matthew Flickstein
- Mawtinzun Pagoda
- Maya
- Maya Devi Temple, Lumbini
- Maya (illusion)
- Mazu Daoyi
- Medawi
- Medhankara
- Medicine Buddha
- Medirigiriya Vatadage
- Meditation
- Meditation attitude
- Menander I
- Mental factors
- Merit
- Mes Aynak
- Mettā
- Metta Sutta
- Middle Way
- Midwest Buddhist Temple Ginza Holiday Festival
- Migettuwatte Gunananda Thera
- Mihintale
- Mikkyō
- Milarepa
- Milinda Pañha
- Mind
- Mindfulness (Buddhism)
- Mindstream
- Mingalaba
- Mingalazedi Pagoda
- Mingun Sayadaw
- Minor Rock Edicts
- Miracles of Gautama Buddha
- Mirisawetiya Vihara
- Mitmor Knife
- Mogao Caves
- Moggaliputta-Tissa
- Moha
- Moheyan
- Monastic education
- Monastic examinations
- Monastic robe (Tricivara)
  - Antaravasaka
  - Uttarasanga
  - Sangati
- Monastic schools in Myanmar
- Buddhist monasticism
- Mondop
- Mondo
- Monk
- Monkey mind
- Morality
- Mouzi Lihuolun
- Muaro Jambi Temple Compounds
- Mucalinda
- Mudita
- Mudra
- Muean Sumitto
- Muho Noelke
- Mūladvāra Nikāya
- Mūlapariyāya Sutta
- Mulian Rescues His Mother
- Muragala
- Buddhist music
- Musō Soseki
- Muyan
- Myadaung Monastery
- Myōe

== N ==
- Naga Prok attitude
- Nāgārjuna
- Nāgasena
- Nagayon Pagoda
- Nairatmya
- Nakahara Nantenbo
- Nalanda
- Namarupa
- Namtso
- Namu Myōhō Renge Kyō
- Nanhai Jigui Neifa Zhuan
- Ñāṇamoli Bhikkhu
- Ñāṇavīra Thera
- Nanda (half-brother of Buddha)
- Nanda (Buddhist nun)
- Nara, Nara
- Naraka
- Naropa
- Naropa University
- Nasik Caves
- Nauyane Ariyadhamma Mahathera
- Navayana
- Nekkhamma
- Nenang Pawo
- Neo-Buddhism
- Nettipakarana
- Newar Buddhism
- Ngagpa
- Ngahtatgyi Buddha Temple
- Nianfo
- Nibbana
- Nichiren
- Nichiren Buddhism
- Nichiren Shōshū
- Nichiren-shū
- Nidana
- Niddesa
- Nikāya
- Nikaya Buddhism
- Nikkō (priest)
- Nīlakaṇṭha Dhāraṇī
- Nio protectors
- Nipponzan-Myōhōji
- Nirvana
- Nissarana Vanaya
- Niyama
- Noble Eightfold Path
- Non-returner
- Non-self
- Novice monk
- Novice nun
- Nubchen Sangye Yeshe
- Nun
- Nung Chan Monastery
- Nyanadassana Mahathera
- Nyanaponika Thera
- Nyanatiloka Mahathera
- Nyingma
- Nyingmapa
- Nyogen Senzaki

== O ==
- Ōbaku
- Oda Sesso
- Offering (Buddhism)
- Old age
- Ole Nydahl
- Om
- Om mani padme hum
- Once-returner
- Ordination hall
- Ōryōki
- Outline of Buddhism

== P ==
- Pa-Auk Forest Monastery
- Pa-Auk Sayadaw
- Pabbajjā
- Paccekabuddha
- Pacific Zen Institute
- Padmasambhava
- Padumuttara Buddha
- Pagoda
- Pagoda festival
- Pahalawattage Don Premasiri
- Pahtodawgyi
- Pakhannge Monastery
- Pak Ou Caves
- Palane Vajiragnana Thera
- Pāli
- Pāli Canon
- Pali literature
- Pali Text Society
- Panadura
- Pancasila
- Panchen Lama
  - 1st Panchen Lama (Khedrup Gelek Pelzang)
  - 2nd Panchen Lama (Sönam Choklang)
  - 3rd Panchen Lama (Ensapa Lobsang Döndrup)
  - 4th Panchen Lama (Lobsang Chökyi Gyaltsen)
  - 5th Panchen Lama (Lobsang Yeshe)
  - 6th Panchen Lama (Lobsang Palden Yeshe)
  - 7th Panchen Lama (Palden Tenpai Nyima)
  - 8th Panchen Lama (Tenpai Wangchuk)
  - 9th Panchen Lama (Thubten Choekyi Nyima)
  - 10th Panchen Lama (Choekyi Gyaltsen)
  - 11th Panchen Lama (Gedhun Choekyi Nyima)
  - 11th Panchen Lama (Gyaincain Norbu)
- Pancika
- Pandita
- Paññā
- Paññāsa Jātaka
- Papañca
- Papañcasūdanī
- Parable of the Poisoned Arrow
- Paracanonical texts (Theravada Buddhism)
- Parakramabahu I
- Paramartha
- Paramita
- Parinibbana (Parinirvana)
- Parinibbana of Mahamoggallana
- Paritta
- Parivara
- Pariyatti
- Pariyatti (bookstore)
- Parwati Soepangat
- Pasenadi
- Passaddhi
- Path Press
- Paticcasamuppāda
- Patience
- Patikulamanasikara
- Pāṭimokkha
- Patisambhidamagga
- Patna
- Paṭṭhāna
- Paubha
- Paul Dahlke
- Pāvā
- Pavarana
- Pawo
- Payathonzu Temple
- Peace Revolution
- Perception
- Perfect Enlightenment Sutra
- Perfection of Wisdom
- Perfection of Wisdom School
- Persecution of Buddhists
- Peta
- Petakopadesa
- Petavatthu
- Phassa
- Pha That Luang
- Phaung Daw U Pagoda
- Philip Kapleau
- Philosophy of Buddhism
- Phowa
- Phra Bang
- Phra Brahmapundit
- Phra Buddha Jinaraja
- Phra Dhammavisuddhikavi
- Phra Mae Thorani
- Phra Mahathat Kaen Nakhon
- Phra Malai Kham Luang
- Phra Paisal Visalo
- Phra Pathom Chedi
- Phra Phuttha Sihing
- Phra Phutthaworayan
- Phra Pidta
- Phra That Kham Kaen
- Phra Thep Siddhakhom
- Phuang malai
- Phuket Big Buddha
- Phurba
- Phutthachan
- Phutthamonthon
- Physical characteristics of the Buddha
- Buddhist pilgrimage
- Pillars of Ashoka
- Pindaya Caves
- Pindola Bharadvaja
- Pirivena
- Pitalkhora Caves
- Pīti
- Piyadasi
- Piyadassi Maha Thera
- Platform Sutra
- Buddhist poetry
- Polonnaruwa Vatadage
- Polwatte Buddhadatta Thera
- Pomnyun
- Post-canonical Buddhist texts
- Potala Palace
- Poya
- Poy Sang Long
- Prabashvara
- Pragyananda Mahasthavir
- Prahevajra
- Prajna
- Prajna (Buddhist Monk)
- Prajnananda Mahathera
- Prajnaparamita
- Prajnaparamita of Java
- Prajnaptisastra
- Prajñaptivāda
- Prakaranapada
- Prakrit
- Pranidhipurna Mahavihar
- Prasaṅgika
- Prasat (Thai architecture)
- Pratimoksha
- Pratītyasamutpāda
- Pratyekabuddha
- Buddhist prayer beads
- Prayer wheel
- P. A. Payutto
- Preah Maha Ghosananda
- Precept, Samadhi, Enlightenment
- Pre-sectarian Buddhism
- Prince Sattva
- Proliferation
- Prostration
- Pudgalavāda
- Puggalapannatti
- Puja
- Puṇṇa Mantānīputta
- Pure Abodes
- Pure land
- Pure Land Buddhism
- Purisa
- Purity in Buddhism
- Mount Putuo
- Pyatthat
- Pyrrhonism

== Q ==
- Queen Maya
- Queen Maya's Dream

== R ==
- Rāhula
- Rainbow body
- Rajagaha
- Rajguru Aggavamsa Mahathera
- Rajguru Priyo Ratana Mahathera
- Ramagrama stupa
- Rāmañña Nikāya
- Ramifications of the Buddha concept
- Rangjung Rigpe Dorje
- Ratanapañña Thera
- Ratana Sutta
- Ratmalane Sri Dharmaloka Thera
- Ratnasambhava
- Reality in Buddhism
- Reb Anderson
- Rebirth (Buddhism)
- Reclining Buddha
- Refuge (Buddhism)
- Reincarnation
- Relics associated with Buddha
- Relics of Sariputta and Moggallana
- Relic of the tooth of the Buddha
- Rennyo
- Renunciation
- Ridi Viharaya
- Rime movement
- Rhinoceros Sutra
- Rinpoche
- Rinzai
- Rōben
- Robert Baker Aitken
- Rohatsu
- Rohini (Buddha's disciple)
- Rōshi
- Ruth Denison
- Rumtek
- Rūpa
- Ruwanwelisaya
- Ryōkan

== S ==
- Sacca
- Sacca-kiriyā
- Sacred Mountains of China
- Saddan Cave
- Saddha
- Sagaing
- Saichō
- Sakadagami
- Śakra (Buddhism)
- Sakyapa
- Sakya Pandita
- Sala kan parian
- Saḷāyatana
- Salin Monastery
- Samadhi
- Samadhi Statue
- Samadhiraja Sutra
- Samanera
- Samanera Bodhesako
- Samaneri
- Samaññaphala Sutta
- Samantabhadra (Bodhisattva)
- Samantapasadika
- Samatha
- Samavati
- Samaya
- Sambhogakaya
- Sambuddhatva jayanthi
- Saṃghabhadra
- Saṃjñā
- Sammādiṭṭhi Sutta
- Sampajañña
- Samsara
- Samu Sunim
- Saṃvega
- Samvriti
- Samyak
- Samye
- Saṃyukta Āgama
- Samyutta Nikaya
- Sanam Luang Dhamma Studies
- Śāṇavāsa
- Sanchi
- Sandakada pahana
- Sandamuni Pagoda
- Sand mandala
- Sand pagoda
- Sangati
- Sangha
- Sanghamitta
- Sanghapala
- Sangharaj Nikaya
- Sangharaja
- Sangharakshita
- Sangharama
- Sangha Supreme Council
- Sanghata Sutra
- Sangitiparyaya
- Sangrai festival in Bangladesh
- Sankassa
- Saṅkhāra
- Sanlun
- Sañña
- Sanskrit
- Santacittārāma
- Śāntarakṣita
- Santi Asoke
- Sanzen
- Saptparni cave
- Saraha
- Sariputta
- Sariputta in the Jatakas
- Śarīra
- Sarnath
- Sarvastivada
- Sati
- Satipatthana
- Satipatthana Sutta
- Satori
- Satuditha
- Sautrāntika
- Savatthi
- Sāvaka
- Sāvakabuddha
- Satta sambojjhaṅgā
- Sautrantaka
- Sawlumin inscription
- Sayadaw
- Sayadaw U Narada
- Sayadaw U Pandita
- Sayadaw U Paññāvaṃsa
- Sayadaw U Rewata Dhamma
- Sayadaw U Tejaniya
- Schools of Buddhism
- Buddhism and science
- Secular Buddhism
- Seema Malaka
- Sela Cetiya
- Sengyou
- Sense bases
- Sensei
- Sentience
- Seon
- Seongcheol
- Sesshin
- Sesshū Tōyō
- Sesson Yūbai
- Seto Machindranath
- Seung Sahn
- Sevan Ross
- Seven Factors of Enlightenment
- Shaila Catherine
- Shaka at Birth (Tōdai-ji)
- Shakyamuni
- Shakyo
- Shamarpa
- Shambhala
- Shambhala Buddhism
- Shambhala Training
- Shangpa Kagyu
- Shanti Stupa, Ladakh
- Shantideva
- Shaolin Monastery
- Sharon Salzberg
- Sheng-yen
- She of Little Faith
- Shichidō garan
- Shikantaza
- Shin Arahan
- Shinbyu
- Shin Mahasilavamsa
- Shin Panthagu
- Shin Raṭṭhasāra
- Shin Upagutta
- Shin Uttarajiva
- Shinbutsu bunri
- Shinbutsu kakuri
- Shinbutsu-shūgō
- Shingon
- Shinran
- Shite-thaung Temple
- Shivneri Caves
- Shodo Harada
- Shraddha TV
- Shravakayana
- Shravasti
- Shukongōshin
- Shunryu Suzuki
- Shurangama Mantra
- Shurangama Sutra
- Shussan Shaka
- Shwedagon Pagoda
- Shwegugyi Temple
- Shwegyin Nikaya
- Shwegyin Sayadaw
- Shweinbin Monastery
- Shwe Indein Pagoda
- Shwemawdaw Pagoda
- Shwemokhtaw Pagoda
- Shwenandaw Monastery
- Shwesandaw Pagoda (Bagan)
- Shwesandaw Pagoda (Pyay)
- Shwesandaw Pagoda (Twante)
- Shwesannwe Sayadaw
- Shwethalyaung Hill
- Shwethalyaung Pagoda
- Shwe Yin Myaw Pagoda
- Shwezedi Monastery
- Shwezigon Pagoda
- Shwezigon Pagoda Bell Inscription
- Siam Nikaya
  - Asgiri Maha Viharaya
  - Malwathu Maha Viharaya
- Sibi Jataka
- Siddhartha Gautama
- Sigalovada Sutta
- Sihinganidāna
- Sikhī Buddha
- Sikkim Mahinda Thero
- Sik Kok Kwong
- Śīla
- Sīlācāra
- Silk Road transmission of Buddhism
- Silver Pagoda, Phnom Penh
- Similarities between Pyrrhonism and Buddhism
- Simsapa tree
- Sir U Thwin
- Sitagu Sayadaw
- Sitatapatra
- Sithulpawwa Rajamaha Viharaya
- Sīvali
- Six heretical teachers
- Six realms
- Sixteen Arhats
- Six yogas of Naropa
- Skanda (Buddhism)
- Skandha
- Smot (chanting)
- Sobin Yamada
- Soen Nakagawa
- Soeng Hyang
- Soka Gakkai
- Soko Morinaga
- Solosmasthana
- Soma Thera
- Somawathiya Chaitya
- Somdej Toh
- Somdet Kiaw
- Somdet Thit Uthayo
- Songdhammakalyani Monastery
- Songtsän Gampo
- Sotāpanna
- Sōtō Zen
- Soto Zen Buddhist Association
- Southern, Eastern and Northern Buddhism
- Soyen Shaku
- Soyu Matsuoka
- Sravaka
- Sri Kalyani Yogasrama Samstha
- Sri Maha Bodhi
- Sri Lankan Forest Tradition
- Sri Piyaratana Tissa Mahanayake Thero
- Sri Singha
- Sri Sumangala College
- Standing Buddha
- State Pariyatti Sasana University, Mandalay
- State Pariyatti Sasana University, Yangon
- State Sangha Maha Nayaka Committee
- Stephen T. Asma
- Sthavira nikāya
- Store consciousness
- Stream-enterer
- Buddhist Studies
- Stupa
- Stupas in Sri Lanka
- Subcommentaries, Theravada
- Subhuti
- Sudarshan Mahasthavir
- Suddhananda Mahathero
- Suddhipanthaka
- Suddhodana
- Suffering
- Sujata
- Sujata Stupa
- Sujin Boriharnwanaket
- Sukha
- Sukhavati
- Sukhothai Historical Park
- Sulak Sivaraksa
- Sulamani Temple
- Sule Pagoda
- Sumedha
- Sumedha Buddha
- Sumeru
- Sundarānanda
- Sundari Nanda
- Sunita
- Sunlun Sayadaw
- Suññatā
- Supernormal powers
- Supreme Patriarch of Cambodia
- Supreme Patriarch of Thailand
  - 4th Supreme Patriarch of Thailand
  - 7th Supreme Patriarch of Thailand
  - 8th Supreme Patriarch of Thailand
  - 9th Supreme Patriarch of Thailand
  - 10th Supreme Patriarch of Thailand
  - 12th Supreme Patriarch of Thailand
  - 16th Supreme Patriarch of Thailand
  - 17th Supreme Patriarch of Thailand
  - 18th Supreme Patriarch of Thailand
  - 19th Supreme Patriarch of Thailand
  - 20th Supreme Patriarch of Thailand
- Supushpachandra
- Suramgamasamadhi sutra
- Suryaprabha
- Suzanne Karpelès
- Sutra
- Sutra of Forty-two Chapters
- Sutta Nipata
- Sutta Pitaka
- Suttavibhanga
- D. T. Suzuki
- Svabhava
- Svatantrika
- Swayambhunath
- Syama Jataka
- Symbolism
- Sympathetic joy
- Sylvia Boorstein

== T ==
- Tagundaing
- Taiktaw Monastery
- Taisen Deshimaru
- Taisho Tripitaka
- Taixu
- Taizan Maezumi
- Tamote Shinpin Shwegugyi Temple
- Tak Bat Devo
- Takuan Sōhō
- Tanaka Chigaku
- Taṇhā
- Taṇhaṅkara Buddha
- Tantkyitaung Pagoda
- Tantra
- Tantric sex
- Tara
- Tara Brach
- Taranatha
- Tarka sastra
- Trapusa and Bahalika
- Tathāgata
- Tathagatagarbha doctrine
- Tathagatagarbha Sutra
- Tathālokā Bhikkhunī
- Tathātā/Dharmatā
- Taung Galay Sayadaw
- Taunggwin Sayadaw
- Taung Kalat
- Taungpulu Kaba-Aye Sayadaw
- Tawagu Pagoda
- Taxila
- Tazaungdaing Festival
- Temple of the Tooth
- Tendai
- Tengyur
- Ten Fetters
- Ten Perfections
- Tep Vong
- Ten Principal Disciples
- Ten spiritual realms
- Ten Stages Sutra
- Ten Thousand Buddhas Monastery
- Tenzin Gyatso
- Terma
- Terton
- Tetsugen Bernard Glassman
- Thai Buddhist sculpture
- Thai Forest Tradition
- Thai temple art and architecture
- Thadingyut Festival
- Thagyamin
- Thamanya Sayadaw
- Thangka
- Thanissaro Bhikkhu
- Thanlyin Mingyaung Sayadaw
- Thatbyinnyu Temple
- Thathanabaing
- That Luang Festival
- Thayettaw Monastery
- The Buddha and His Dhamma
- The Buddhist (TV channel)
- The Light of Asia
- Theragatha
- Theravada
- Therigatha
- The Twin Miracle
- Thích Ca Phật Đài
- Thich Nhat Hanh
- Thiên Ân
- Thilashin
- Thīna
- Thingyan
- Thirteen Buddhas
- Thirty-Five Confession Buddhas
- Thomas William Rhys Davids
- Three Ages of Buddhism
- Threefold Training
- Three Jewels
- Three Jewel Temples of Korea
- Three marks of existence
- Three poisons (Buddhism)
- Three Roots
- Three spheres
- Three types of Buddha
- Three Vajras
- Thubten Chodron
- Thubten Yeshe
- Thubten Zopa Rinpoche
- Thudhamma Gaing
- Thuparamaya
- Tiantai
- Tibetan art
- Tibetan Buddhism
- Tibetan Buddhist architecture
- Tibetan Buddhist canon
- Tibetan calendar
- Tibetan people
- Tiloka
- Tilopa
- Timeline of Buddhism
- Tipitaka
- Tipiṭakadhara Dhammabhaṇḍāgārika
- Tipitakadhara Tipitakakovida Selection Examinations
- Ti-Ratana Welfare Society
- Tisarana
- Ti-Sarana Buddhist Association
- Tissamaharama Raja Maha Vihara
- Tittha Sutta
- Tonglen
- Torma
- Trailokyavijaya
- Tranquillity
- Transfer of merit
- Trapusa and Bahalika
- Trāyastriṃśa
- Tricivara
- Tricycle: The Buddhist Review
- Tricycle Foundation
- Trijang Lobsang Yeshe Tenzin Gyatso
- Tripitaka Koreana
- Tripiṭaka tablets at Kuthodaw Pagoda
- Triple Gem
- Triratana
- Trisula
- Trayastrimsa
- Trikaya
- Tsechu
- Je Tsongkhapa
- Tsurphu Monastery
- Tulku
- Tulku Urgyen Rinpoche
- Tusita
- Twenty-two vows of Ambedkar
- Twelve Auspicious Rites
- Twelve Nidanas
- Two Truths Doctrine
- Types of Buddha

== U ==
- U Ba Khin
- Ubon Ratchathani Candle Festival
- Udāna
- Udanavarga
- Uddaka Rāmaputta
- U Dhammaloka
- Udumbara (Buddhism)
- Uisang
- U Khandi
- Ullambana Sutra
- U Nārada
- Unitarian Universalist Buddhist Fellowship
- U Ottama
- Upadana
- Upajjhatthana Sutta
- Upali
- Upali Thera
- U Pannya Jota Mahathera
- Upāsaka
- Upasampada
- Upaya
- Upekkha
- Uposatha
- Uppalavanna
- Uppatasanti Pagoda
- Urna
- Ushnisha
- U Thuzana
- Uttarasanga
- U Vimala
- U Wisara

== V ==
- Vaibhāṣika
- Vairochana
- Vaiśravaṇa
- Vajira (Buddhist nun)
- Sister Vajira
- Vajra
- Vajradhara
- Vajrapani
- Vajrasana, Bodh Gaya
- Vajrasattva
- Vajrayana
- Vajrayogini
- Varanasi
- Vassa
- Vassa candle
- Vasubandhu
- Vasudhara
- Vatadage
- Vatsīputrīya
- Vedanā
- Velukandakiya
- Veḷuvan Nikāya
- Vemacitrin
- Vesak
- Vesali
- Vessantara Festival
- Vessantara Jātaka
- Vibhajjavada
- Vibhanga
- Vicara
- Vidyalankara Pirivena
- Vidyodaya Pirivena
- View
- Vihāra
- Vihara Buddhagaya Watugong
- Vijjota
- Vijnanakaya
- Vimalakirti Sutra
- Vīmaṃsaka Sutta
- Vimanavatthu
- Vimuttimagga
- Vinaya
- Vinaya Pitaka
- Viññāṇa
- Vipaka
- Vipassana
- Vipassana Meditation Centre
- Vipassana movement
- Vipassanā-ñāṇa
- Virūḍhaka
- Virūpākṣa
- Vīrya
- Visakha
- Visakha Vidyalaya
- Visuddhajanavilasini
- Visuddhimagga
- Visungkhamsima
- Vitakka
- Vitakkasaṇṭhāna Sutta

== W ==
- Walk for Peace
- Walpola Rahula Thero
- Wan Ok Phansa
- Wang ocheonchukguk jeon
- Brad Warner
- Wat
- Wat Ananda Metyarama Thai Buddhist Temple
- Wat Ananda Youth
- Wat Aranyawiwake
- Wat Arun Ratchawararam
- Wat Bowonniwet Vihara
- Wat Buddhapadipa
- Wat Buppharam, Chiang Mai
- Wat Buppharam, Penang
- Wat Buppharam, Trat
- Wat Chayamangkalaram
- Wat Chedi Liam
- Wat Chedi Luang
- Wat Chetawan
- Wat Lok Moli
- Wat Mai Suwannaphumaham
- Wat Manorom
- Wat Nong Pah Pong
- Wat Pah Nanachat
- Wat Paknam Bhasicharoen
- Wat Paknam Japan
- Wat Pa Maha Chedi Kaew
- Wat Phnom
- Wat Phra Dhammakaya
- Wat Phra Dhammakaya Manchester
- Wat Phra Kaeo Don Tao
- Wat Phra Kaew
- Wat Phra Kaew, Chiang Rai
- Wat Phra Mahathat
- Wat Phra Phutthabat
- Wat Phra Singh
- Wat Phra Si Rattana Mahathat
- Wat Phra Si Sanphet
- Wat Phrathat Doi Suthep
- Wat Phra That Hariphunchai
- Wat Phra That Phanom
- Wat Ratchapradit
- Wat Suan Dok
- Wat Suthat
- Wat Vihear Suor
- Wat Xieng Thong
- Wat Yai Chai Mongkhon
- Alan Watts
- Webu Sayadaw
- Weligama Sri Sumangala
- Weliwita Sri Saranankara Thero
- What the Buddha Taught
- White Horse Temple
- Wisdom
- Wisdom King
- Womb Realm
- Women in Buddhism
- Won Buddhism
- Woncheuk
- Wonhyo
- Wooden fish
- Woodenfish Foundation
- World Fellowship of Buddhists
- World Peace Pagoda, Lumbini
- Wrathful deity
- Wumen Huikai
- Mount Wutai

== X ==
- Xuanzang

== Y ==
- Yagirala Pannananda
- Yaksha
- Yakushi
- Yamabushi
- Yamada Koun
- Yamaka
- Yana
- Yan Aung Myin Shwe Lett Hla Pagoda
- Yasodharā
- Yatala Vehera
- Yaw Mingyi Monastery
- Yazawin Kyaw
- Ye Dharma Hetu
- Ye Le Pagoda
- Yeshe Dorje
- Yeshe Losal
- Yeshe Tsogyal
- Yeshe Walmo
- Yidam
- Yifa
- Yin Shun
- Yinyuan Longqi
- Yoga
- Yogacara
- Yot Akkavamso
- Young Buddhist Association
- Young Men's Buddhist Association
- Young Men's Buddhist Association (Burma)
- Yuanfen
- Yungang Grottoes
- Yunmen Wenyan
- Yuquan Shenxiu

== Z ==
- Zafu
- Zambala
- Zayat
- Zazen
- Zen
  - Zen center
  - Zen Centre
  - Zendo
  - Zen in the United States
  - Zen master
  - Zen Peacemakers
- Zenkei Shibayama
- Zenshuji Soto Mission
- Zen Studies Society
- Zentatsu Richard Baker
- Zhabdrung Rinpoche
- Zhang Zhung culture
- Zhaocheng Jin Tripitaka
- Zhaozhou Congshen
- Zhisheng
- Zhiyi
- Zhuan Dao
- Zhu Fonian
- Zinkyaik Pagoda
- Zoketsu Norman Fischer
- Zongmi

== See also ==
- Buddhism
- Outline of Buddhism
- Buddhist terms and concepts
- List of Buddhists
- List of Buddhist temples
