= The Three Buddhas =

The Three Buddhas may refer to:

- Trikaya, the Buddhist doctrine of the Three Buddhas
- The Three Buddhas depicted in traditional Chinese temple halls:
  - The Buddhas of the Three Times, namely Dipankara Buddha (or Kassapa Buddha) of the past, Shakyamuni Buddha of the present, and Maitreya Buddha of the future, or
  - The Buddhas of the Three Jewels, namely Shakyamuni Buddha, Bhaisajyaguru Buddha, and Amitabha Buddha
- Three Buddha Hall (Sanbutsudō, 三仏堂) at the Rinnō-ji temple in Nikko, Japan
- Three Buddhas Hall, at the Puhua Temple in Taihuai Town, Wutai County, Xinzhou, China
- Sam Poh Tong Temple (also known as the Three Buddhas Cave) in Ipoh, Perak, Malaysia

== See also ==
- Payathonzu Temple (Temple of Three Buddhas), a Buddhist temple in Minnanthu, Burma
- Three types of buddha
