= Buddhism in Saudi Arabia =

The International Religious Freedom Report 2007, of U.S. Department of State, estimated that more than 8 million foreigners are living and working in Saudi Arabia, including Muslims and non-Muslims.

There are 400,000 Sri Lankans, as well as a few thousand Buddhist workers from East Asia and Southeast Asia, the majority of which are: Chinese, Vietnamese, and Taiwanese. There is also a possibility that a percentage of Nepalese immigrants also help make up the estimated 8 million foreign residents in Saudi Arabia.

This amount of foreign inhabitants makes about 1.5% of Saudi Arabia's population Buddhists, or around 400,000 nominal Buddhists, most likely giving Saudi Arabia the largest Buddhist community in the Middle East or Arab World.

The practice of Buddhism, like all religions other than Islam, is illegal in Saudi Arabia. Adherents must therefore practice only in private.

== See also ==
- Index of Buddhism-related articles
