= Pakhannge Monastery =

Buddhist monastery in Myanmar

Coordinates: 21°32′34.3″N 95°14′57.9″E

- ပခန်းငယ်ကျောင်း

Religion
- Affiliation: Theravada Buddhism

Location
- Country: Yesagyo Township, Magway Region, Burma
- Interactive map of Pakhannge Monastery

Architecture
- Founder: King Mindon Min
- Completed: 1864; 162 years ago

Pakhannge Monastery (Burmese: ပခန်းငယ်ကျောင်း) is a Buddhist monastery in Pakhannge village, SaLay Township, Magway Region, Myanmar (Burma). A historic site, the monastery is the largest extant Konbaung era wooden monastery in the country. In 1996, the Burmese government submitted the monastery, along with other exemplars from the Konbaung dynasty for inclusion into the World Heritage List.

According to monastic records, the monastery's construction was ordered by King Mindon Min and completed by court ministers and sawbwas on 16 acres (6.5 ha) of land. The edifice was dedicated by Mindon Min's uncle, the Pakhan Mingyi Yan Way for the Pandu Sayadaw U Visuddha, a prominent Konbaung-era monk and teacher of Mindon Min.

The monastery construction required 7 years and 100 carpenters who used traditional architectural techniques. The wooden monastery was built using 332 teak pillars under the direction of Burmese architect Tha Gyi. Due to years of neglect, only the teak pillars and masonry work remain.

== See also ==
- Kyaung
- Myathalun Pagoda
- Tantkyitaung Pagoda
- Thihoshin Pagoda
