= Abhibhavayatana =

Meditation is achieved in eight stages by mastering the senses

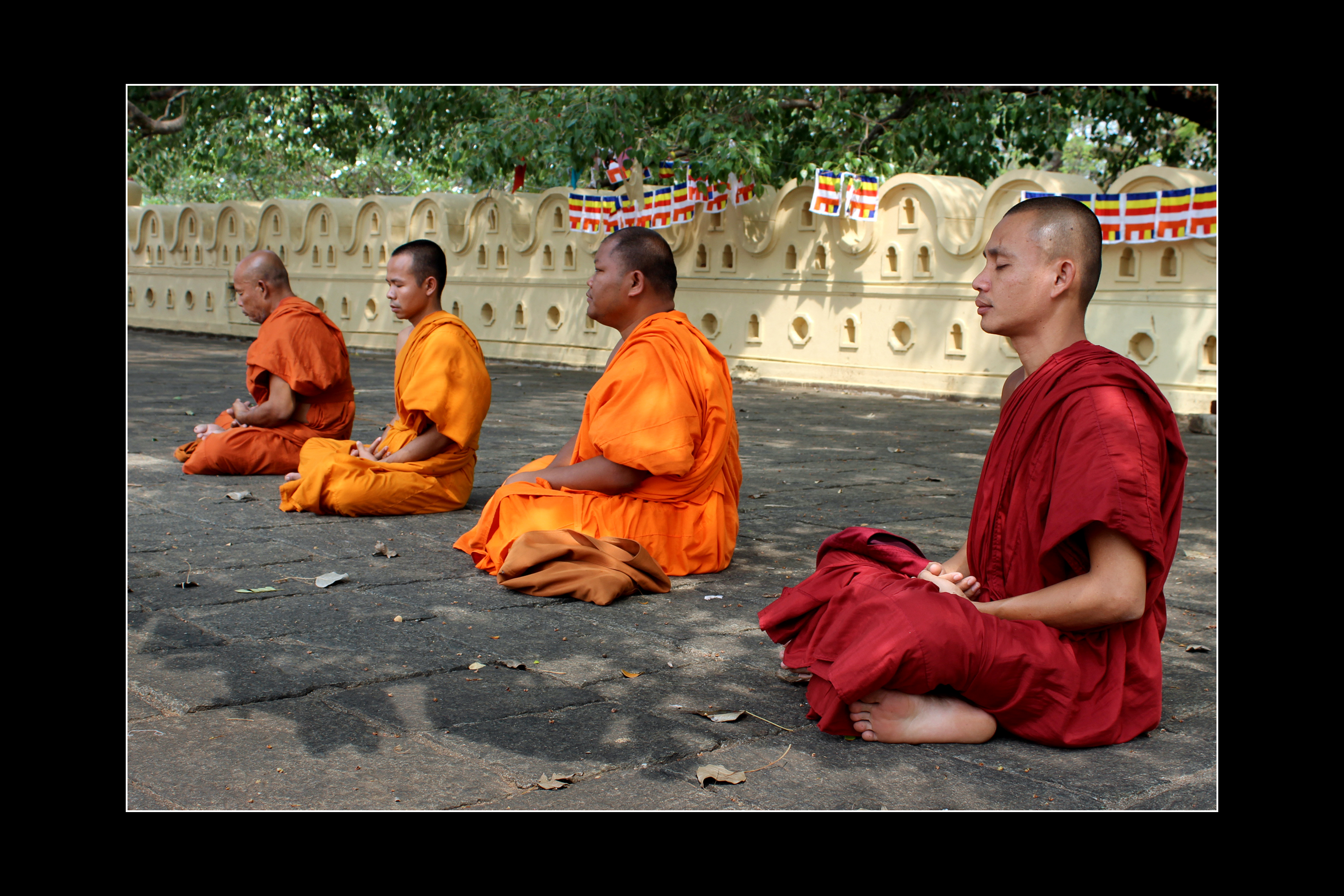
Abhibhāvayatana

Abhibhāvayatana (Sanskrit: Abhibhvāyatana, Pali: Abhibhāyatana), or abhibhāyatana (Sanskrit: Abhibhāyatana, Pali: Abhibhāyātana, "control of perceptions"), is a concept in Buddhism through which meditation is achieved in eight stages by mastering the senses. During this process, the practitioner separates himself from the physical world, frees himself from attachments to physical forms, and begins freeing himself from pain and pleasure of the material world tied to suffering in Buddhism.

The eight stages of abhibhāvayatana are:

1. Mastery of perception of the form of one's own body and limited forms beyond it
2. Mastery of perception of the form of one's own body, and of forms beyond it
3. Mastery of perception of formlessness in relation to one's own body and limited forms beyond it
4. Mastery of perception of formlessness in relation to one's own body and the whole world beyond it
5. Mastery of perception over different forms of beauty (stages 5–8)

== See also ==
- Index of Buddhism-related articles
- Schools of Buddhism
- Secular Buddhism
