= Sujin Boriharnwanaket =

Thai Vipassana and Abhidhamma teacher

Sujin Boriharnwanaket (Thai: สุจินต์ บริหารวนเขตต์; RTGS: Suchin Borihanwanakhet; born January 13, 1927) is a Thai Vipassana and Abhidhamma teacher. She graduated from Triam Udom High School and has published numerous books and articles in Thai and English.

== Awards ==
On March 6, 2007, she was given the Outstanding Woman in Buddhism award in Bangkok at the United Nations office.

== Books in English ==
- Answering Dhamma Questions, Adelaide : Adelaide Dhamma Study Group, 1977
- The Development of Insight, Bangkok : Thailand : Abhidhamma foundation, 1979
- Metta: Loving kindness in Buddhism, Nina van Gorkom translation : Triple Gem, 1995
- Taking Refuge in Buddhism, Nina van Gorkom translation : Zolag, 1996
- Realities and concepts : the Buddha's explanation of the world, Nina van Gorkom translation : Thailand : Dhamma Study and Support Foundation, 2000
- A Survey of Paramattha Dhammas, Nina van Gorkom translation : Dhamma Study and Support Foundation, 2005
- The Perfections Leading to Enlightenment, Nina van Gorkom translation : Zolag, 2007
