= Eindawya Pagoda =

Buddhist Pagoda in Mandalay, Myanmar

- အိမ်တော်ရာဘုရား
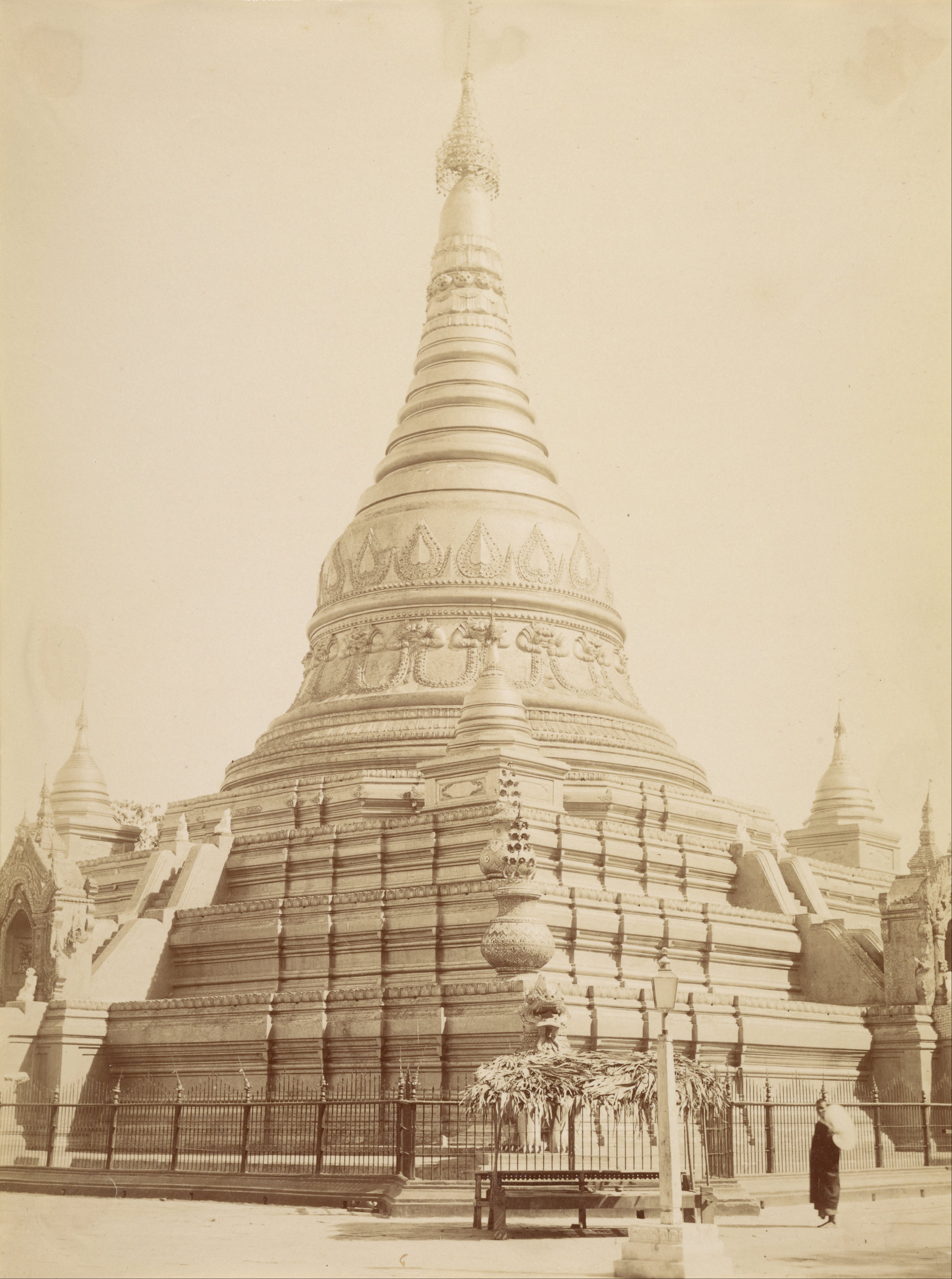

- Location within Myanmar

Religion
- Affiliation: Theravada Buddhism

Location
- Country: Mandalay, Mandalay Region, Myanmar
- Coordinates: 21.981625°N 96.072465°E

Architecture
- Founder: King Pagan Min
- Completed: 1847; 179 years ago

Eindawya Pagoda (Burmese: အိမ်တော်ရာဘုရား; lit. 'royal house pagoda') is a Buddhist stupa located in Mandalay, Myanmar. It was built by King Pagan Min in 1847, on the site of his summer house when he was a prince; gilt from top to bottom; a shrine of fine proportions. The pagoda stands at a height of 114 feet (35 m).

== Gallery ==
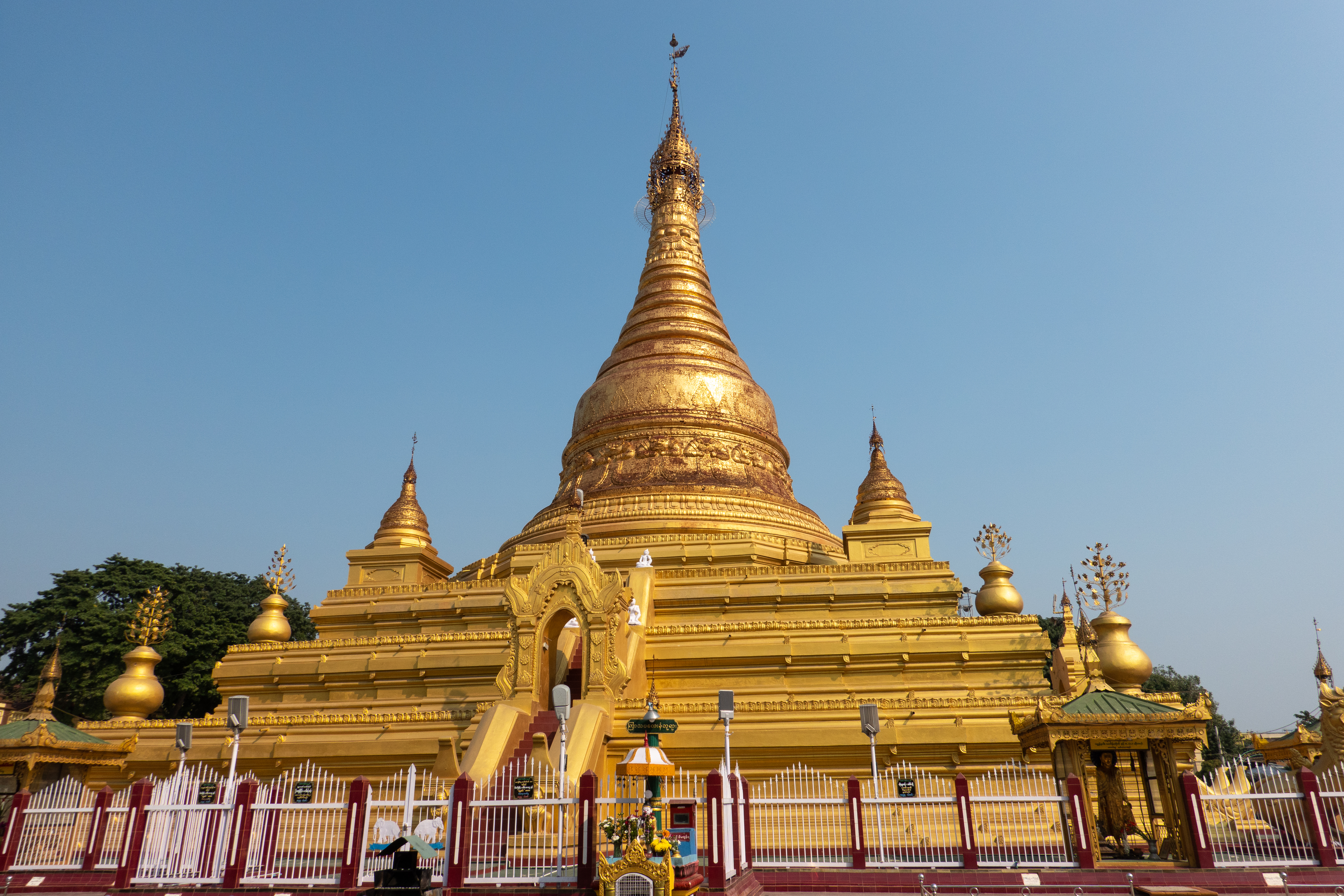
Main Pagoda

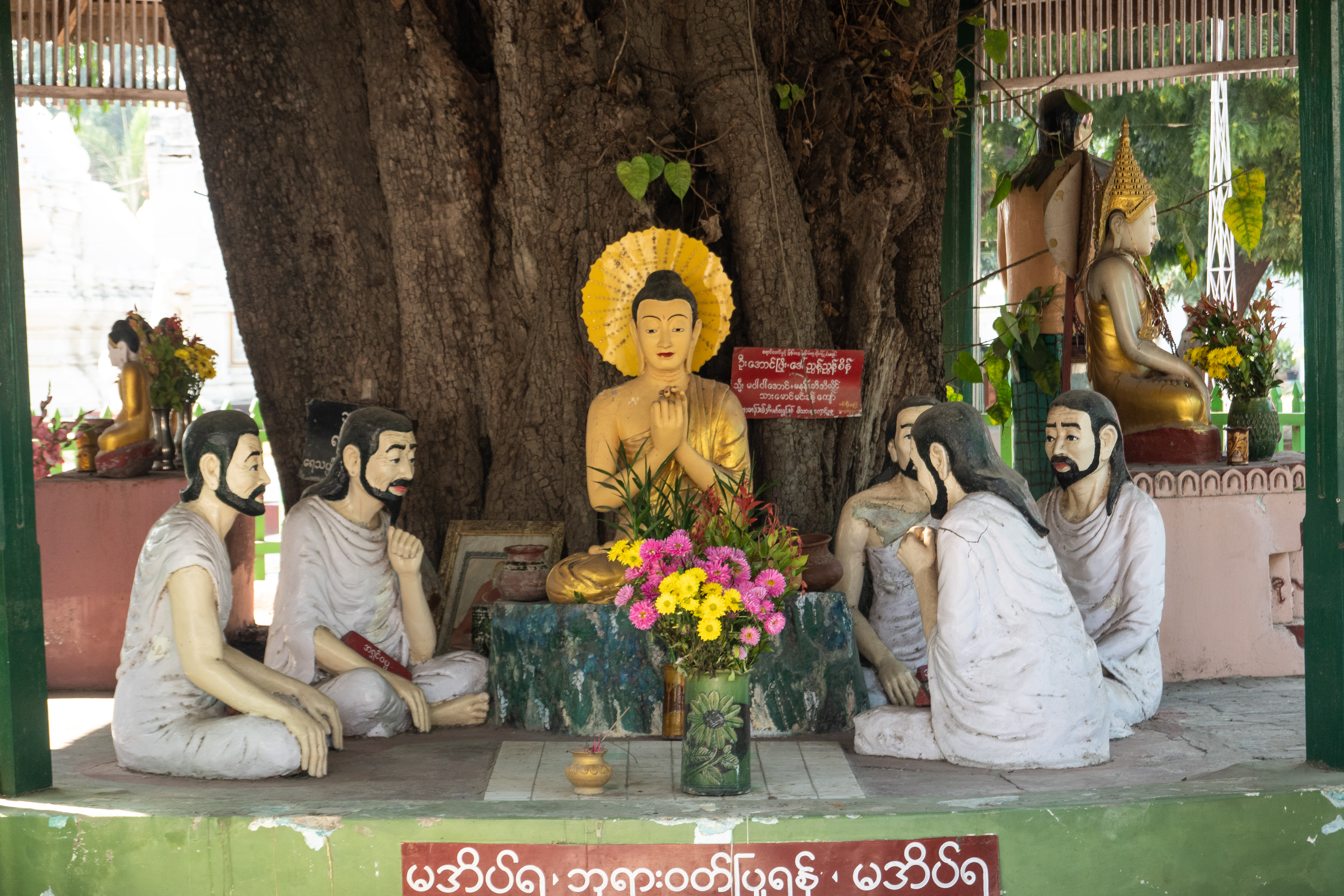
Bodhi tree with Buddha statue

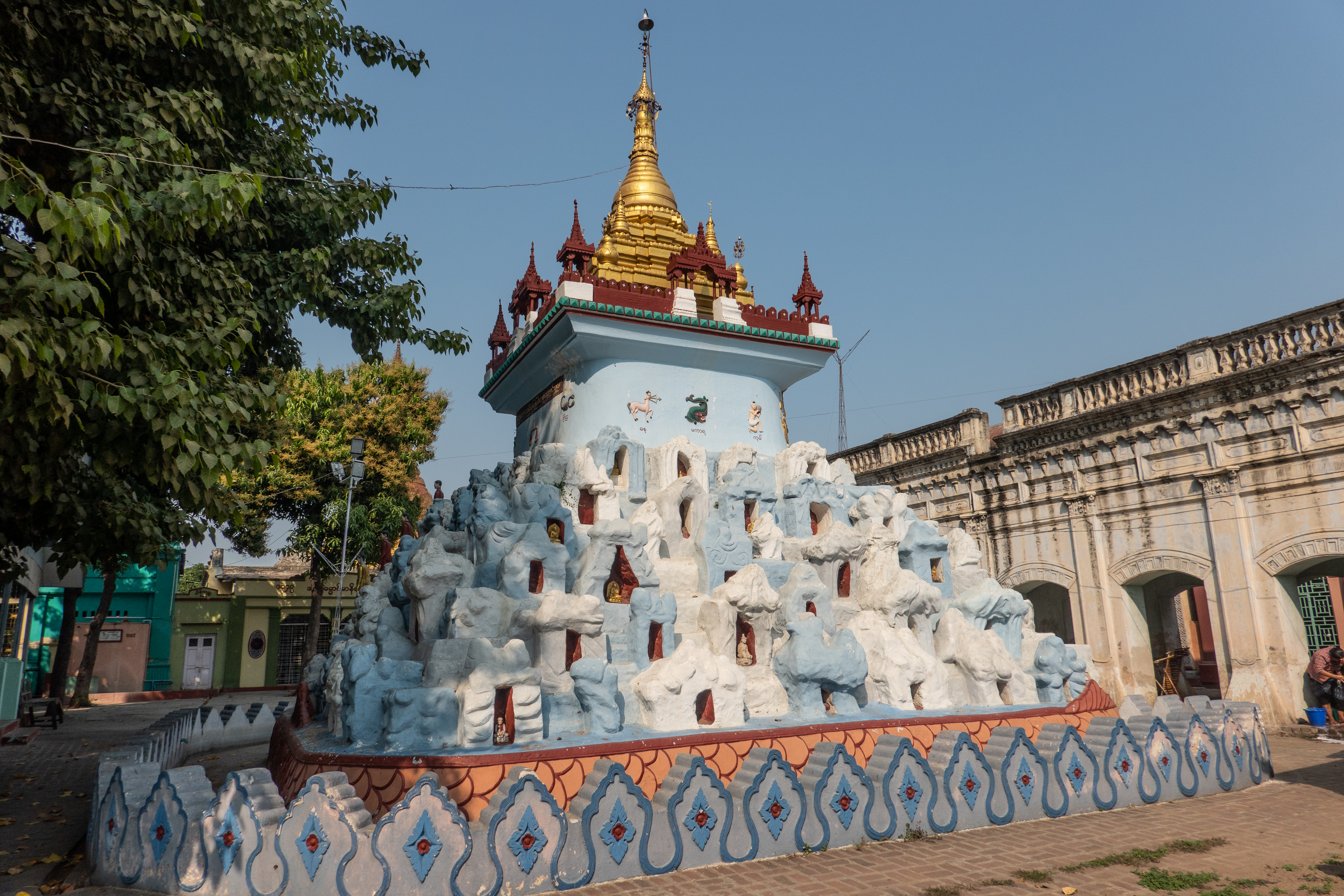
Small Pagoda south of Main pagoda

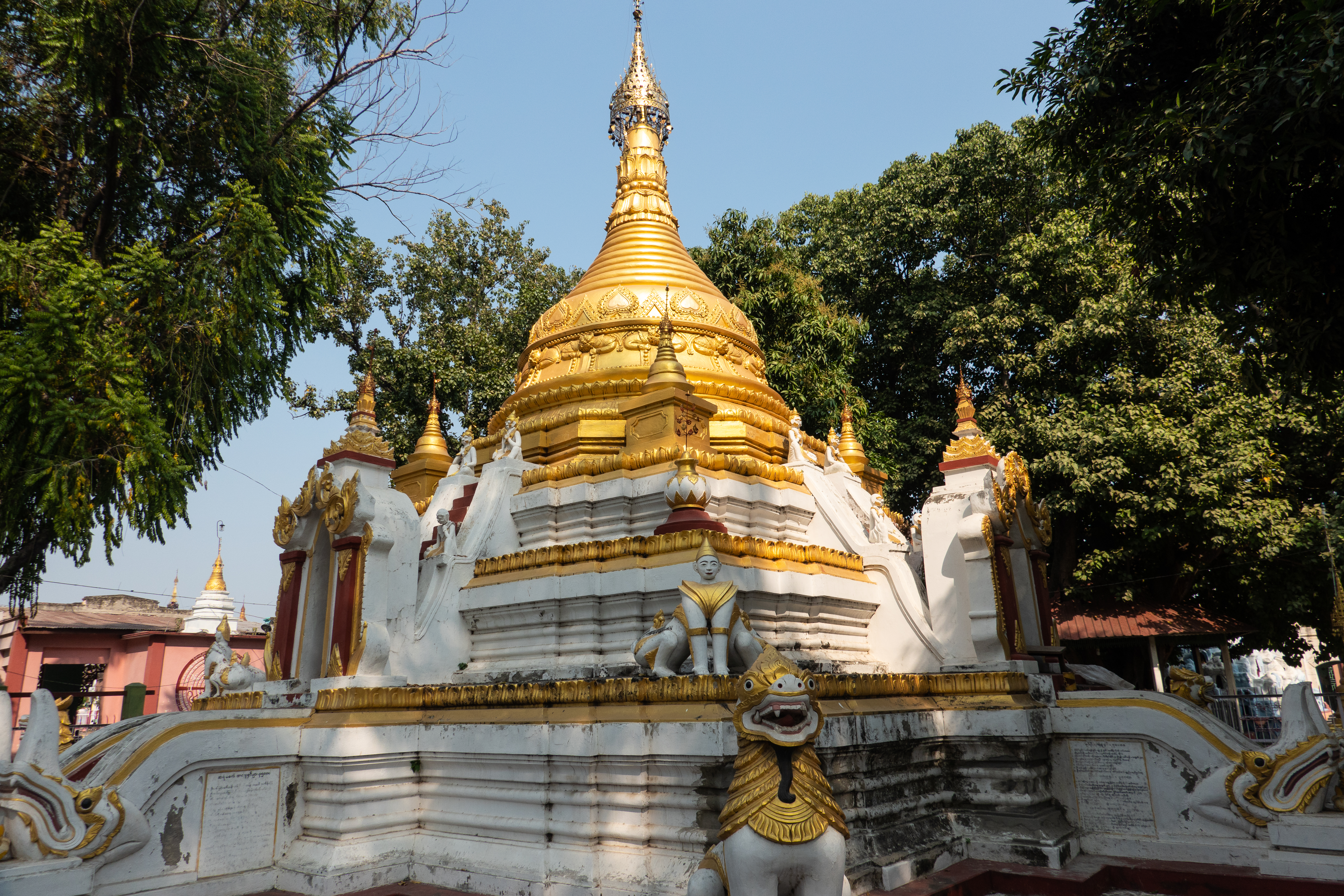
Another small Pagoda south of Main pagoda

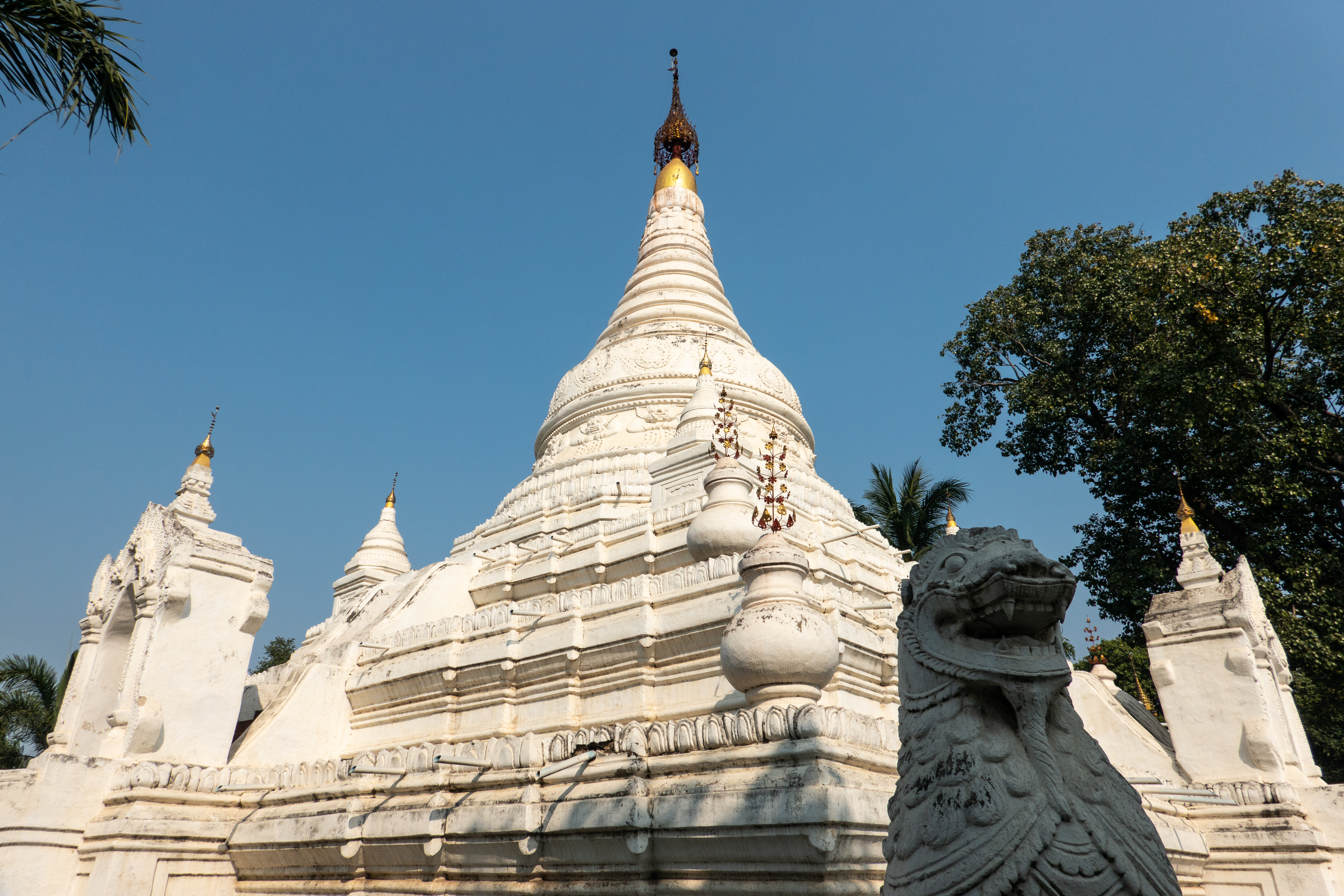
Big Pagoda southwest of Main pagoda

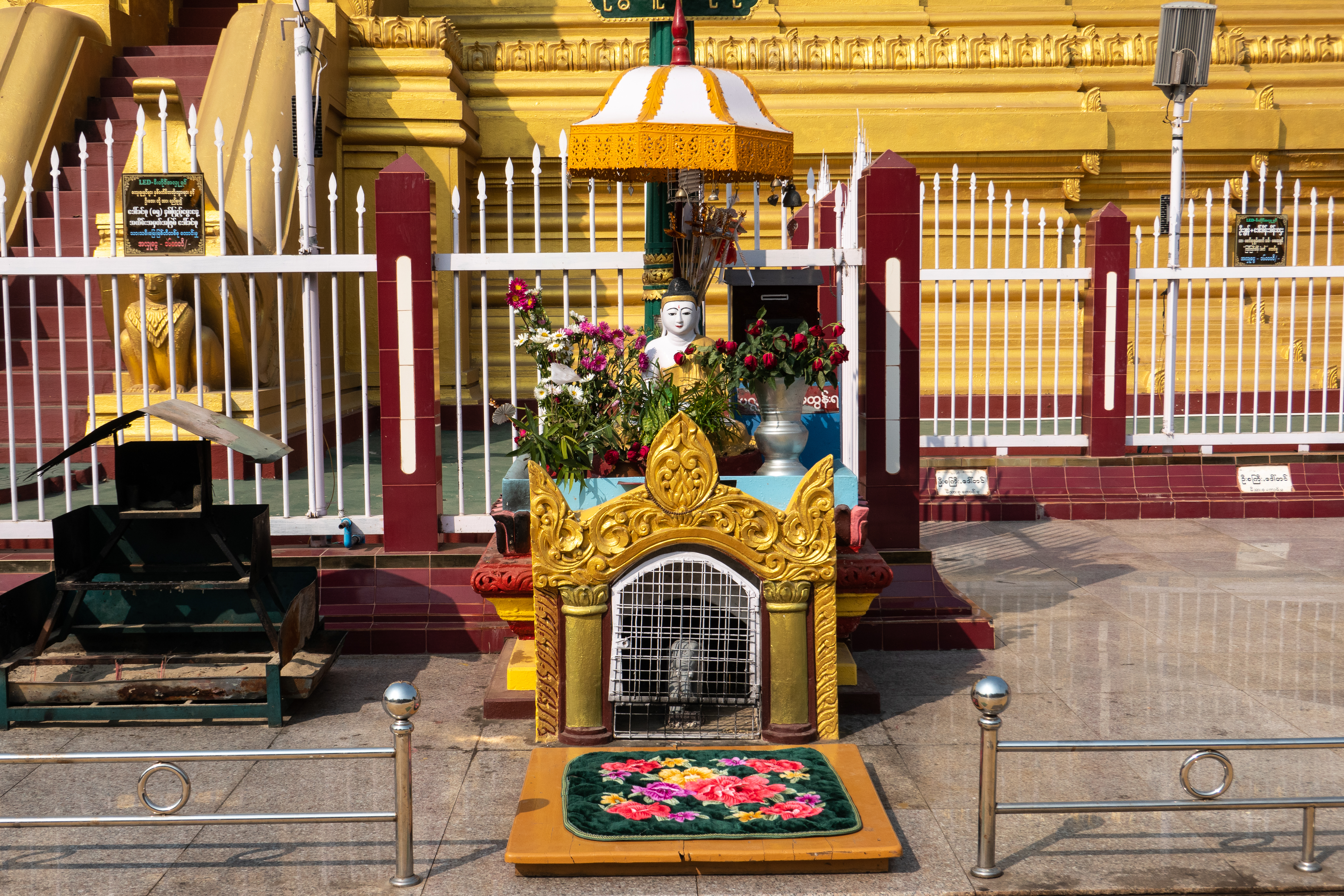

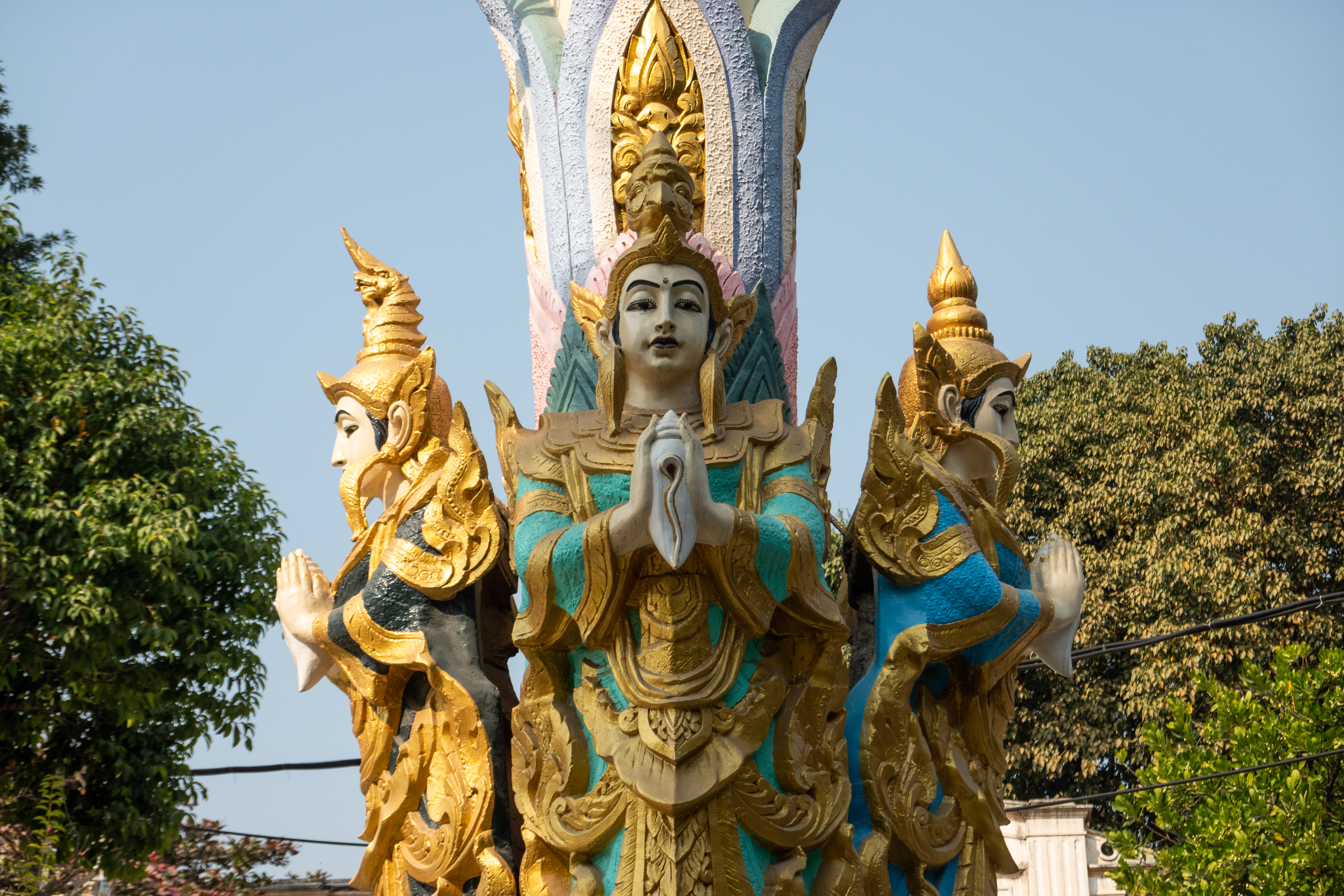

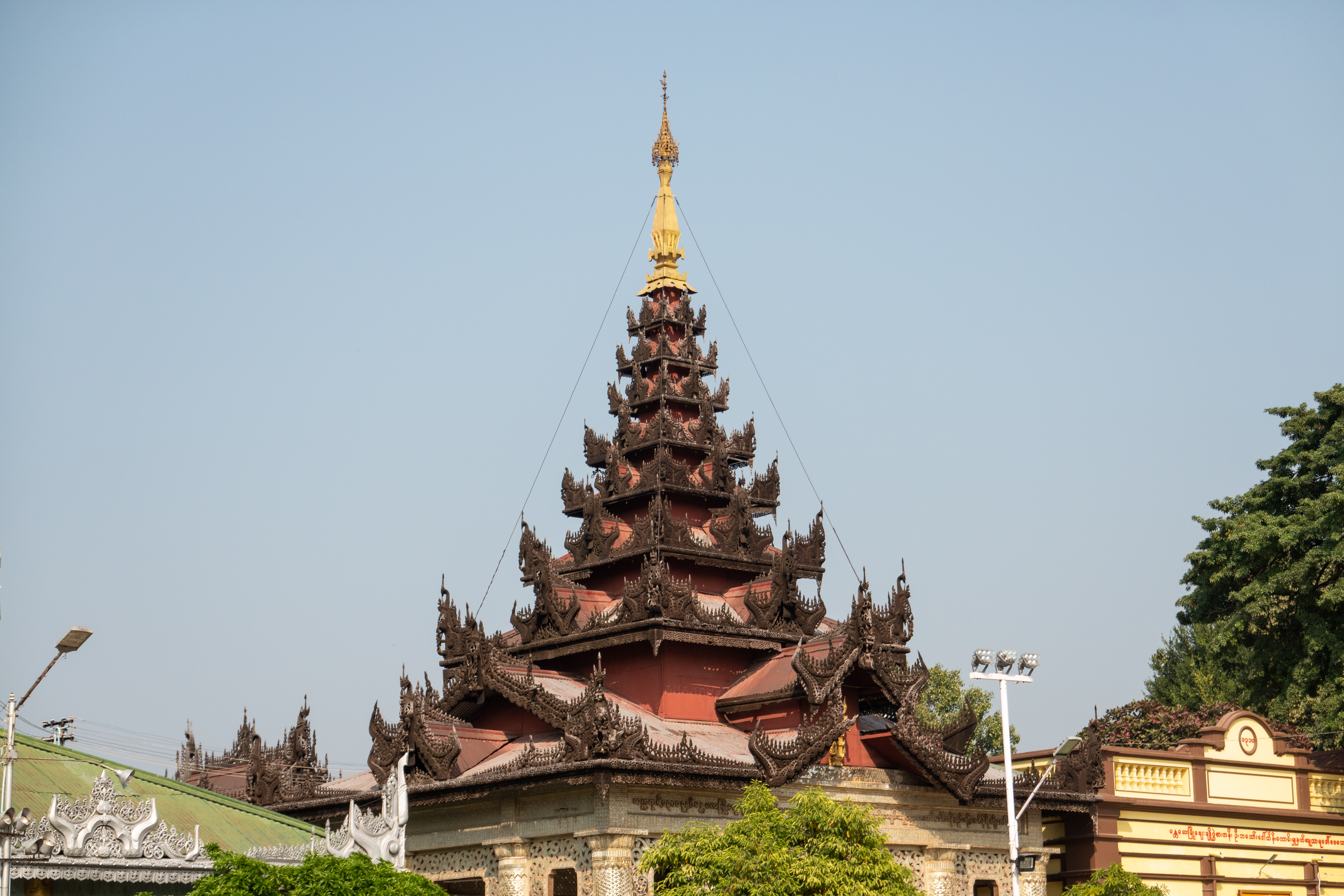
