= Kaichō =

Public exhibition of religious objects from Buddhist temples

Kaichō (開帳; in honorific form go-kaichō), from the Edo period of Japan onwards, was the public exhibition of religious objects from Buddhist temples, usually relics or statuary, that were normally not on display. Such exhibitions were often the bases for public fairs, which would involve outdoor entertainment activities, market trading, and misemono. In the period from 1654 to 1868, in Edo city there were 1566 kaichō.

Kaichō literally means "the opening of the curtain", and the purpose of keeping such icons hidden from public view except on special occasions was twofold. First, it upheld the sanctity of the objects that were displayed, where making them viewable to the public all of the time would otherwise serve to devalue their religious impacts. Second, it served as both advertisement and as a fund-raiser for the temple—primarily, but not solely, to pay for building repair.

Accounts of such kaichō being held in Kamakura and Kyoto can be found dating from before the Edo period, but they only became truly popular during the 17th century. The occurrence of kaichō outside of temple grounds were primarily an Edo city phenomenon. The first such exterior kaichō in Edo was in 1676.

Many kaichō were also degaichō, where the activities broadened into the opening of an entire area of the temple, turning it into a form of carnival, with entertainments, food vendors, and even freak shows, or with the religious objects being transported on a tour around the country. Technically, a degaichō is a kaichō outside temple grounds, and an igaichō is a kaichō where the display is within temple grounds. In theory, attendance at a kaichō was free of charge. In practice, attendees were expected to pay a fee upon entry, and to donate an extra gratuity upon viewing the object displayed. A kaichō would create an economic boom for the businesses around the temple, and were widely advertised and promoted.

Kaichō were organized with the permission of the state. Much of the information on the kaichō in Edo, for example, is recorded in Bukō nenpyō, a diary kept by Edo Kanda town official Saitō Gesshin, and in the Kaichō sashi yuyushichō, the bakufu record of the government-approved kaichō. Bakufu approval for degaichō comprised a meeting of the bakufu officials to assess the fundraising case for the proposed kaichō, which would grant permission for a kaichō lasting up to 60 days from the date that the approval was granted. Much of this regulation was imposed in order to eliminate competition for business. However, state regulation was not entirely motivated by this. Although the bakufu in Edo in the 18th century granted only five permits per season, limited to a maximum of sixty days, it was readily prepared to grant extensions to length and to grant special permits. The government saw kaichō as a means for combatting its budget deficit, by eliminating the grants that it had theretofore provided to temples in favour of temples organizing kaichō to raise their own funds.

The association of kaichō with non-religious activities, and the secularization of the event, led to the name becoming a slang appellation, in 19th century Edo, for any activity where a person indulged in revelry and frolics in an unusual or inappropriate place, or, further, for a crowd caught up with gambling fever or a person lost the heat of sexual passion.
