= Buddhaghosa Mahasthavir =

Fifth Sangha Nayaka of Theravada Order in Nepal

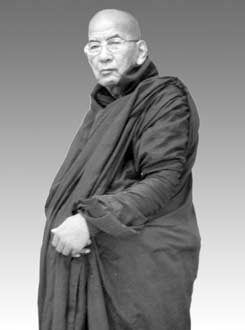

Personal life
- Born: Sapta Ratna Vajracharya; 12 October 1921 Kwa Baha, Kathmandu, Nepal
- Died: 24 September 2011 (aged 89)
- Occupation: Buddhist monk

Religious life
- Religion: Buddhism
- School: Theravada
- Dharma name: Buddhaghosa Mahasthavir
- Ordination: Mandalay, Burma

Buddhaghosa Mahasthavir (Nepali: बुद्धघोष महास्थविर, born Sapta Ratna Vajracharya, 12 October 1921 – 24 September 2011) was a Nepalese Buddhist monk who worked to revive Theravada Buddhism in Nepal in the 1940s in the face of suppression by the Rana regime.

He was the founder of Pariyatti Shiksha (Buddhist education) in the country, and in 2006 was named the fifth Sangha Nayaka (Chief Prelate).

== Early life ==
Sapta Ratna was born to father Purnananda and mother Surjamaya Vajracharya in Kwa Baha, Kathmandu. In 1940, he went to Kushinagar, India, and was ordained as a novice monk. He was given the Dhamma name Buddhaghosa. He then went to Burma, where he studied Buddhism and meditation, and in 1943 received higher ordination as a full monk in Mandalay. He was the first from a Vajracharya family to become a Theravada monk.

== Dhamma work ==
Returning to Nepal, Buddhaghosa (alternative names: Bhante Buddhaghosa, Buddhaghosa Mahathero) lived at the monastery of Sumangal Vihar in Lalitpur and dedicated himself to spreading the Buddha's message. The 1940s were bad times for Buddhist monks, and a number of them had been expelled for preaching and producing Buddhist literature.

After the fall of the Rana regime and establishment of democracy in Nepal in 1951, Theravada Buddhist monks could preach freely. In 1963, Buddhaghosa started Pariyatti Shiksha and revolutionized Buddhist education by teaching it in a scientific manner. The weekly Dhamma classes attracted large numbers of youths, and the study of Buddhism progressed beyond sermons and services.

Buddhaghosa authored, translated, or edited 22 books in Nepal Bhasa and Nepali on the Tripitaka, which consists of the Theravada Buddhist scriptures.

== Honors ==
In 1999, Buddhaghosa was decorated with the title of Aggamahasaddhammajotikadhaja (light of supreme teaching) by the government of Myanmar for his contribution to Buddhism.
