= Doṇa Sutta =

Short Buddhist discourse concerning the Buddha's nature or identity

The Dona-sutta is a short Buddhist discourse between a brahmin and the Buddha concerning his nature or identity. It is preserved in five versions: one in Pali (Anguttara ii.37-30), one in the Gandharan Buddhist Texts and three in Chinese parallel translations (Taisho vol 2.717c, 2.28a and 2.467a).

According to the Dona-sutta, the Buddha was once questioned by a brahmin called Dona, or Dhuma according to two of the Chinese versions. This brahmin comes across the Buddha's footprints and notices the wheel marks on the soles of his feet. Amazed by what he has seen, he follows them until he comes to where the Buddha is serenely seated. He then poses the Buddha certain questions. At this point, interpretation of the sutta in English language becomes somewhat controversial, since there is not a consensus regarding the proper English translation of the verb bhavissati, a key word used in Dona's questions.

== Translation of 'bhavissati' ==
The Pali, Gandharan, and one of the Chinese versions (T II 467b8), report that the question of Dona was put in the future tense, in Pali this is the word bhavissati. In the other two Chinese versions the question of Dona is in the present tense, but it is acknowledged that all Chinese versions are a translation from earlier Indian versions of the Dona Sutta, which used the future tense. Thus the original Indian versions are believed to have all contained the question of Dona in the future tense, as in the Pali bhavissati.

Literally translated, bhavissati refers to the future and means "will be, will become", but, according to a well-known Pali idiomatic usage, it can also be interpreted as an expression of uncertainty, confusion or amazement relating to the present. Thus, in some translations the bhavissati is literally translated as the future tense, so that the question posed by Dona pertains to what Buddha will be/become, asking whether he will be/become a god, a gandharva, a yaksha or a human. The Buddha answers these questions literally, saying that he will not be/become (na bhavissāmi) any of these beings [in the future], implying that since he is a Buddha he will not be reborn after this life. The Chinese translation at T II 467b8 follows this reasoning, and literally reads "I will not obtain human".

The alternative translation is based on this possible idiomatic usage of the future tense in Pali, and understands the brahmin Dona to be asking the Buddha in confusion or amazement what he is—a god (deva), a gandharva, a yaksha or human. The Buddha answers emphatically that he is not any of these (na bhavissāmi), but that he is a Buddha. This reasoning is used in the Chinese translations of T 2.717c and T 2.28a.

The idiomatic interpretation of bhavissati can also refer to some uncertainty which is present. Thus, a translation which would interpret the future tense as indicative of some uncertainty in the questioner, the question might be translated as "Whether the Buddha 'might' or 'would' be a god, a gandharva, a yaksha or a human". The answer would be put in the same way as the reply, giving the answer that "I might not be a god, gandharva, yaksha or human", or "I would not be a god, gandharva, yaksha or human", though this rendering is liable to other undesirable interpretations.

Thus there are three possible translations:

1. I will not be a god, gandharva, yaksha or human. (future tense)
2. I am not a god, gandharva, yaksha or human. (present tense, not allowing uncertainty)
3. I might (or would) not be a god, gandharva, yaksha or human. (subjunctive, allowing uncertainty)

As the early Indian versions (in Pali Canon and the Gandharan Buddhist Texts) are all formally in the future sense and only become formulated in present tense in one of the possible English translations, the first version is often used in Theravadin circles. While the Buddha in the second version states that he is a Buddha, and not a god or human, no philosophical conclusions are made explicit in this statement, while it suggests that a Buddha may belong to another category of being in nature, beyond the human and the divine, by virtue of his enlightenment and liberation. The third version may be put forward as an attempt to compromise between the first and second versions.

== Parallel versions ==
Of the several Chinese parallel versions, the one contained in the Ekottara-āgama, attributed to the Mahāsānghikas, preserves a simpler, shorter and older form of this sutra. It treats Dona's questions as enquiries about the Buddha's present status, but omits the specific answer given by the Buddha, that he is a Buddha, found in all other versions. Here, the Buddha merely states that he knows that attachment and desire are the sources of the skandhas (the constituents of individual existence) and through that knowledge he has ended suffering. Thus, though the Mahāsānghikas are known to have espoused a form of docetism, the version of the Dona-sutta used by them does not imply that the Buddha is a transcendental being in human form, while the version preserved in Pali may be open to that interpretation.
