= Abhidharmadīpa =

Sarvāstivāda Abhidharma text

The Abhidharmadīpa or Lamp of Abhidharma is an Abhidharma text thought to have been authored as a response to Vasubandhu's Abhidharmakośa. The text consists of verses, kārikā, and a prose commentary, the Vibhāṣāprabhāvṛtti. It currently survives as an incomplete collection of Sanskrit fragments.

== Manuscripts and Editions ==
A Sanskrit manuscript of the work was discovered by Rāhula Sāṅkṛtyāyana in 1937 in Tibet. The manuscript, which comprises the verses of the Abhidharmadīpa and the commentary Vibhāṣāprabhāvṛtti, has been critically edited in 1959 by Padmanabh Jaini, who reports that 62 of about 150 folios of the original had been preserved. The printed Devanāgarī edition has been romanized and digitized for the Digital Sanskrit Buddhist Canon. Additional material has been identified among the Sanskrit manuscripts discovered at Turfan. A recent discovery has brought to light another 64 folios of apparently the same manuscript, which has been edited by Li 2013 and 2019. Parts of a commentary on the Abhidharmadīpa has also been preserved in Tocharian B.

== Authorship ==
The work was probably composed in the fifth to sixth century. The author refers to himself as the dīpakāra, the "compiler of the (Abhidharma)dīpa. Jaini proposed that the author could have been Vimalamitra, a disciple of Saṃghabhadra. The newly discovered manuscript includes the colophon to the work, which identifies the author as Īśvara. This corresponds to an identification proposed in 1966 by de Jong. His proposal was based on an indication provided by Xuanzang in his Records of the Western Regions (T 2087), which identifies Īśvara (伊濕伐邏) as the author of the Abhidharmadīpaśāstra (阿毘達磨明證論).

== Contents ==
The Abhidharmadīpa comprises eight chapters:

1. Aggregates, sense spheres, and elements (skandha, āyatana, dhātu)
2. Faculties (indriya)
3. Worlds (loka)
4. Action (karma)
5. Underlying tendencies (anuśaya)
6. Path (mārga)
7. Knowledge (jñāna)
8. Concentration (samādhi)

The structure of the Abhidharmadīpa takes Vasubandhu's Abhidharmakośabhāṣya as its model. Over 300 of the verses of the Abhidharmadīpa have close parallels in Abhidarmakośa verses. Jaini identifies 16 hostile references to Vasubandhu in the Vibhāṣāprabhāvṛtti. Their purpose is to refute him on positions that deviate from the established Kāśmīra Sarvāstivāda-Vaibhāṣika orthodoxy.

The Abhidharmadīpa reflects awareness of the bodhicitta concept. The text is also important because it confirms the identity of Vasubandhu as author of the Abhidharmakośakārikā with Vasubandhu the Mahāyāna Yogācāra scholar-monk.

== External link ==
- Entry on the Abhidharmadīpa in the Encyclopedia of Buddhism.
