= Medhankara =

Medhankara is the name of several distinguished members, in medieval times, of the Buddhist order:

- The oldest flourished about 1200, and was the author of the Vinaya Artha Samuccaya, a work in the Sinhalese language on Buddhist Canon law.
- Next after him came Araññaka Medhankara, who presided over the Buddhist council held at Polonnaruwa, then the capital of Ceylon (now Sri Lanka), in 1250.
- The third, Vanaratana Medhankara, flourished in 1280, and wrote a poem in Pāli, Jina Carita, on the life of the Buddha. He also wrote the Payoga Siddhi.
- The fourth was the celebrated scholar to whom King Parākrama Bāhu IV of Ceylon entrusted in 1307 the translation from Pali into Sinhalese of the Jātaka book, the most voluminous extant work in Sinhalese.
- The fifth, a Burmese, was called the Sangharaja Nava Medhankara, and wrote in Pali a work entitled the Loka Padipa fara, on cosmogony and allied subjects.
