= Shwesannwe Sayadaw =

Burmese Theravada Buddhist monk (born 1973)

State Dhammakathika Bahujanahitadhara Bhaddanta Vāyamānanda
- ဝါယမာနန္ဒ

Personal life
- Born: 1973 Sin Tai Village, Yinmabin Township, Sagaing Region, Myanmar
- Education: B.A(Buddhism); M.A(Buddhism); Magadh University, Ph.D
- Other name: Shwesannwe Sayadaw
- Occupation: Buddhist monk

Religious life
- Religion: Buddhism

Ashin Vāyamānanda (Burmese: အရှင်ဝါယမာနန္ဒ), commonly known as Shwesannwe Sayadaw (Burmese: ရွှေဆံနွယ်ဆရာတော်), is a Burmese Theravada Buddhist monk. He was conferred the title of Dhamma Kathika Bahujanahitadhara, one of the highest religious titles, by the government of Myanmar. Sayadaw was a religious representative in the Buddhist cooperation between Myanmar and China. In 2013, he built the charitable Shwesannwe clinics in Sintai to offer free primary medical health care for the poor. He later expanded into an eye hospital in 2018.

== Early life and education ==
The future sayadaw was born on 1973 in Sintai Village, Yinmabin Township, Saging Region, to parents U Kyaw and Daw Nyo.

He completed B.A (Buddhism), M.A (Buddhism) and Ph.D. (Magadh University).

== Publications ==
- အန္တိမဝန္ဒာနာ မြတ်ဆရာ
- အလှဘယ်လိုပြင်ကြမယ်
- အပ်ပျောက်လျှင်ဆင်နဲ့ရှာ
- ပြန်ချိန်တန်လျှင်ပြန်ပါ
- စွမ်းအားကြီးမားကုသိုလ်တရား
- ဘုရားကိုဘယ်လိုဖူးမျှော်ရမလဲ
- နေရာ
- အိမ်ကလေးထဲမှာပျော်မွေ့ပါ
- မနိုးသောအိပ်ခြင်းဖြစ်မှာစိုးတယ်
