= Phra Mahathat Kaen Nakhon =

Coordinates: 16.4081°N 102.8342°E

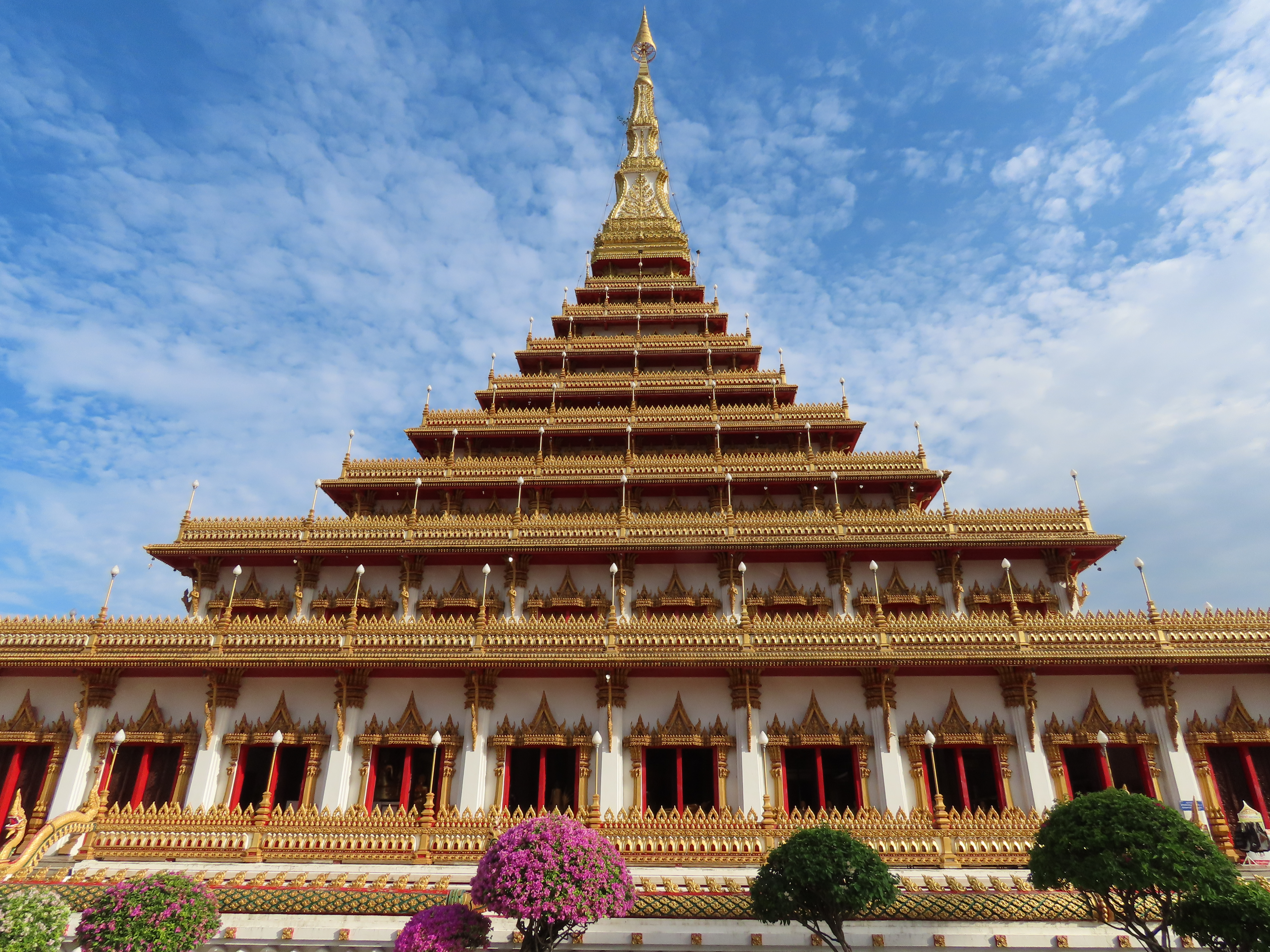
Phra Mahathat Kaen Nakhon

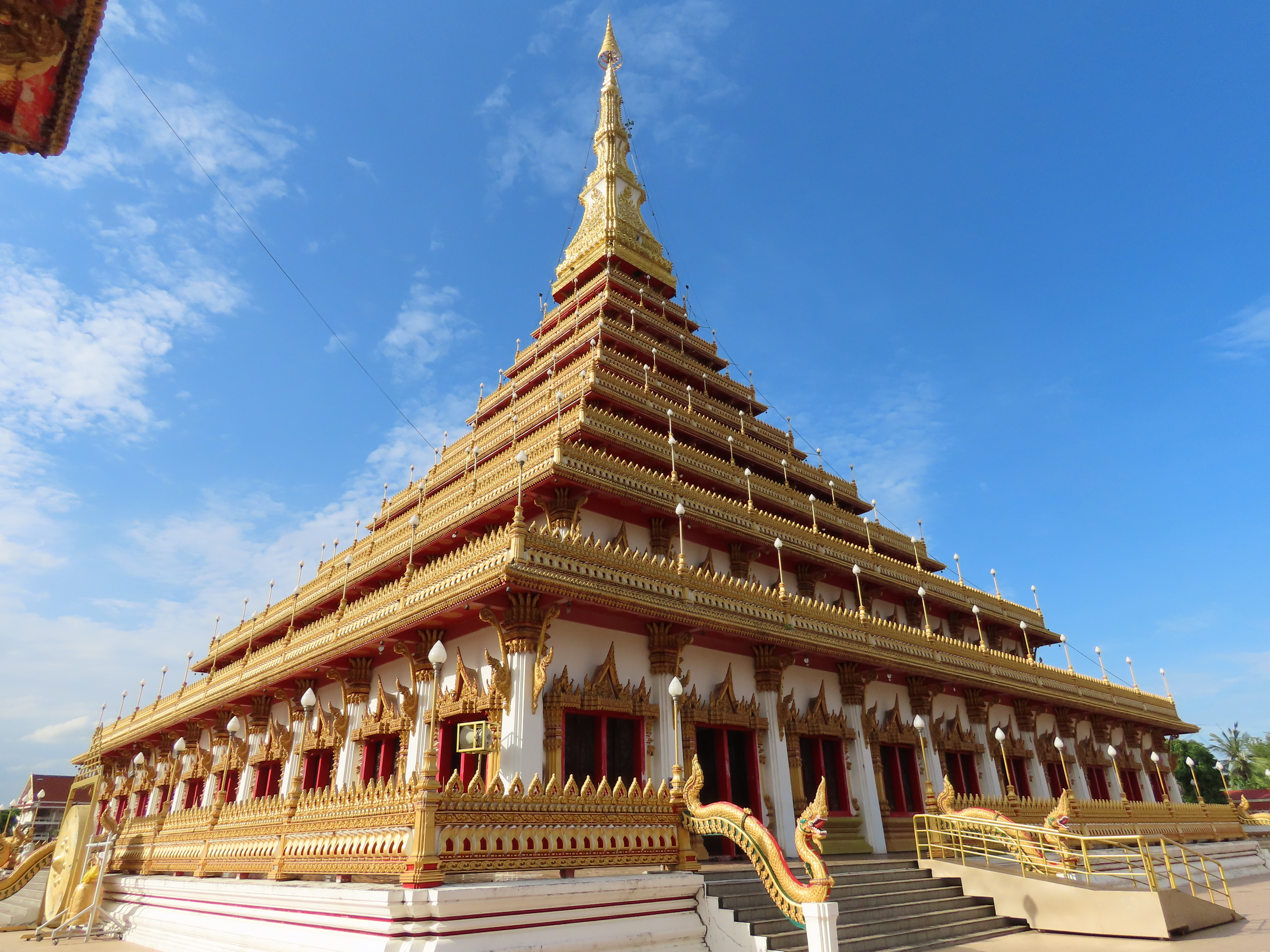
Phra Mahathat Kaen Nakhon

Phra Mahathat Kaen Nakhon,(Thai: พระมหาธาตุแก่นนคร) Kaen Nakhon, 'The Great Buddha's Relics' or 'The Nine Story Stupa Located in Wat Nong Waeng,' is a Thai royal temple of the old town. Wat Nong Waeng is located close to Kaen Nakhon marsh on Klangmuang Road, Muang District. Phra Mahathat Kaen Nakhon was established to celebrate the Golden Jubilee Celebrations of His Majesty Bhumibol Adulyadej's accession to the throne and to celebrate the 200th anniversary of Khon Kaen province's establishment. Its thorough spire, Isaan fishnet shape, Indochina-Dvaravati Era Style, imitated Phra That Kham Kaen. Its base is a square shape of 50 meters on each side and 80 meters in height, where are situated the four-mini-Buddha's relics in each corner sheltered by a seven-head-nāga crystal wall.

== The History of Wat Nong Waeng, the Royal temple ==
Wat Nong Wang, former called Wat Nuae, was established at Ban Bueng Bon (Kaen Nakhon Marsh) along with Wat Klang and Wat That on 1789 by the first ruler, Thao Pia Mueng Pan. In 1811, the latter Thao Jammutra moved city to Ban Don Pan Chat, Muang Maha Sarakham (Ban Nonmuang, Paeng Subdistrict, Kosum Pisai District, Maha Sarakham in present), and Ban Bueng Bon has been an old town since then. Its present address is 593 Klangmueng Road, Naimueng Subdistrict, Mueng Khon Kaen District, Khon Kaen Province. His majesty the king granted its first consecrated boundaries to Phraya Nakhon Sri Borirak (Au) in 1899, and eventually on August, 24th 1984. Its boundary separated from secular area is 40x80 sq. m. Overall temple area is 41.266 km^{2}. which titled by the land certificate 713, no.28, survey page 794, book no.8, page 13. Its temple area is surrounded with communities. Kaen Nakhon Marsh is located at its east. In 1981, this temple was awarded the role-model of a well-developed temple, and in 1983 for the best developed temple. Furthermore, in 1984, it was officially approved as a royal temple.

== Inside ==
Inside the Great Buddha's Relics Temple there are nine stories which are;

1st story, crystal houses for relics of the Buddha are stationed on a movable throne with 3 Buddha images in the middle. On the left are a lot of Buddha's chest bone relics and a lot of disciples' relics contained in the glass jars. Besides there are 108 monk's alms-bowl tables, which each bowl represents one of Buddha's disciples; moreover, people offer coins to get good luck in their life and their family. Go straight to pay respect for the Buddha's image on each birthday to bring good luck. You can also check out your life and cast lots with a Chinese fortuneteller and a brass elephant helping you making all decisions.

2nd story, the Isaan Museum collected the ancient appliances which rarely seen in nowadays. The murals within feature the 35 prohibited rules of Isaan people daily life.

3rd story, the monk-learning hall with its beautifully carved door and windows, featuring Nang Phom Hom, the lasting Isaan tales. This story includes talipot fans, fan of ranks, and eight necessities of famous Khon Kaen monks.

4th story, the monk-learning hall with a museum which is composed of ancient objects: doors and windows, Buddha's picture in each birthday and compass angle.

5th story, a museum hall comprising utensils of Phrakhrupalad Bussaba Sumano, a former abbacy. Doors and windows featured the story of life and former reincarnations of the Buddha.

6th story, a preceptor hall, its doors and windows are carved and featured the Vejsandhorn Jataka tales

7th story, an enlightened Buddha's disciples’ hall, its doors and windows are carved and feature the tale of Prince Temi the Dumb.

8th story, a Buddha's teaching hall assembled Tripitaka, the Buddhist Scriptures. Doors and windows are carved and feature the 16 classes of visible deities in the Brahma's world, and Buddhist rites.

9th story, a Buddha hall and a movable throne placed in the middle houses relics of the Buddha. Doors are carved the featured 3D of the 16 classes of visible deities in the Brahmas world, and Buddhist rites. From there, visitor can enjoy panoramic view of the town especially Kaen Nakhon marsh scene at the east
