= 2013 Ekayana Monastery bombing =

Terrorist attack in Jakarta, Indonesia

2013 Ekayana Monastery Bombing
- Location: 6.1779°S 106.7784°E; Jakarta, Indonesia
- Date: August 4th, 2013; 6:53 p.m (UTC+8)
- Target: Ekayana Monastery
- Attack type: Pipe Bomb
- Deaths: 0
- Injuries: 3
- Perpetrator: Suspected local Islamic militants

A terrorist attack occurred in Jakarta, Indonesia on August 4, 2013 at 6:53 p.m. It targeted a Buddhist monastery named Ekayana in Jakarta. This bombing caused injuries to three people.
