= Aung Zabu Monastery =

Buddhist monastery in Hmawbi, Myanmar

Aung Zabu Forest Monastery
- အောင်ဇမ္ဗူတောရဓမ္မရိပ်သာ

Religion
- Affiliation: Theravada Buddhism

Location
- Country: Hmawbi Township, Yangon Region, Burma
- Interactive map of Aung Zabu Forest Monastery
- Coordinates: 17.0778288969°N 96.0835091118°E

Aung Zabu Forest Monastery (Burmese: အောင်ဇမ္ဗူတောရဓမ္မရိပ်သာ; Aung Zabu Tawya Dhamma Yeiktha), commonly known as Japan Paya (Burmese: ဂျပန်ဘုရား) is a Buddhist monastery (kyaung) in Yegya village, Hmawbi Township, Yangon Region, Myanmar (Burma).

The monastery was opened c. 2012, using the name of a prominent Buddhist retreat centre in Mawlamyine. The monastery is known for a collection of 301 historic Buddha images from the Pagan, Pinnya, Ava, Toungoo, Nyaungyan, Tagaung and Konbaung eras, although the authenticity of these images has not been verified. The images were donated by a Japanese national named Kumano in 2012. Over 10,000 visitors per week visit the monastery.

== Controversies ==
The monastery has been mired in controversy, criticised for being more a business venture, rather than a religious centre. The monastery grounds now include a shopping arcade, a small zoo, and other attractions. In 2023, the monastery's abbot Paṇḍavaṃsa sparked additional controversy after hosting a lavish 60th birthday celebration at Lotte Hotel in Yangon. He also opened a library, which purportedly doubles as a luxury residence, in Pyin Oo Lwin.

== See also ==
- Kyaung
- Thayettaw Monastery
