= Supushpachandra =

Supushpachandra (Sanskrit: Supuṣpacandra) is the name of a bodhisattva mentioned by Shantideva in the Bodhisattvacaryāvatāra. He was ordered by royal law to abstain from teaching Buddhism, but ignored the statute and was executed by King Shuradatta. An account of his tale can be found in the Samadhiraja Sutra.
