= Śuddhipanthaka =

Śuddhipanthaka (Sanskrit: शुद्धिपन्थक; Pali: Suddhipanthaka (Chinese: 周利槃陀伽) was a disciple of the Gautama Buddha. He was traditionally known as the most slow-witted among the Buddha's disciples, unable to remember the Buddha's teachings or even retain short verses.

According to legend, the Buddha once assigned him to sweep the ground. After sweeping for a long time, he reflected: "The ground is clean, but is my mind clean?" This contemplation led him to attain enlightenment.

Suddhipanthaka is an important example that shows that wisdom in enlightenment is not related to wisdom in general memorization (saññā). Wisdom in enlightenment is the bhavanamaya wisdom, which is the ability to use subtle wisdom that comes from using inner wisdom to consider and see the truth of the world by oneself. Therefore, not being good at memorization or studying is not an obstacle to enlightenment.

== History ==
=== Ordained because of his elder brother ===
Suddhipanthaka was the younger brother of Phra Maha Panthaka Thera, who had already attained Arahantship. Inspired by the respect his brother received, Suddhipanthaka expressed a desire to be ordained. His brother agreed and sought permission from their grandfather, Thanasethi, who consented willingly due to his deep faith in Buddhism.

=== Disrobed by his elder brother ===
Upon ordination, his elder brother attempted to teach him a four-line verse:

The lotus flower named Kokanuda has opened its petals at dawn. Its fragrance is endless. Look at Sakyamuni Angkīrasa, whose radiance is bright like the day star, shining in the middle of the sky.

However, after four months, Suddhipanthaka was unable to memorize the verse. Frustrated, his brother expelled him from the monastery due to his dull mind.

=== The Buddha teaches Suddhipanthaka ===
Feeling dejected, Suddhipanthaka wandered to the gate of Wat Chivakamphavan, crying. The Buddha encountered him and inquired about his situation. Upon learning the story, the Buddha encouraged him: "You did not ordain for your brother but for me. Come, stay with me."

The Buddha then handed him a clean white cloth and instructed him to wipe it while repeating "Rajoharanam" ("removal of dust"). As the cloth darkened, Suddhipanthaka realized: "This cloth was once white, but now it is dirty. So too is the mind stained." This insight led him to practice insight meditation (vipassana), through which he attained Arahantship.

Some accounts also mention the Buddha telling him the Cula Setthi Jataka as a teaching aid.

=== Demonstration of supernatural powers ===
The next day, the Buddha and 599 monks were invited to a meal at the house of Dr. Jivaka Komarabhacca. When food was served, the Buddha declined and stated that one monk was missing.

A servant sent to fetch Suddhipanthaka witnessed thousands of identical monks created by Suddhipanthaka's Manomayiddhi power. Unable to identify the real one, he returned. The Buddha instructed him to observe who spoke first and grab his hand. The servant did so, and the illusions vanished. Suddhipanthaka then accompanied him to the meal.

The Buddha praised Suddhipanthaka as the foremost in Ceto-vimutti (liberation of mind) and Manomayiddhi (mental creation).

=== Past karma ===
In a past life, during the time of Buddha Padumuttara, Suddhipanthaka and his brother made great offerings. Upon witnessing a monk praised as foremost in mental liberation, Suddhipanthaka aspired to that status. The Buddha Padumuttara prophesied that after 100,000 kappa he would be reborn as a disciple of Buddha Gotama, attain Arahantship, and be appointed to the same honor.

Later, during the time of Buddha Kassapa, he became a wise monk. However, after mocking another monk for misreciting scriptures, he created negative karma that delayed his progress in future lives. This karma ripened during his lifetime as Suddhipanthaka, causing his initial difficulties in learning.

After attaining Arahantship, he gained mastery of mental powers and was able to multiply his form into 1,000 bodies. He was officially recognized by the Buddha as the most skilled in mental creation and meditation.
