= Jnanayasas =

Buddhist monk from eastern India

Jnanayasas (Sanskrit; Chinese 闍那耶舍 or 尊稱) was a Buddhist monk from Magadha, eastern India. He was recognised by Emperor Wen of Sui China and taught the monks Yasogupta and Jnanagupta.

He translated 7 scriptures in 51 fascicles, including:

- Sutra of Great Compassion (大悲經)
- Sutra of Moon Store (月藏經)

== Sources ==
- Translators in Sui Dynasty and Tang Dynasty
