= Alodawpyi Pagoda =

12th century Buddhist Pagoda in Bagan, Myanmar

Coordinates: 21°10′37″N 94°52′57″E

Alo-daw Pyi Pagoda
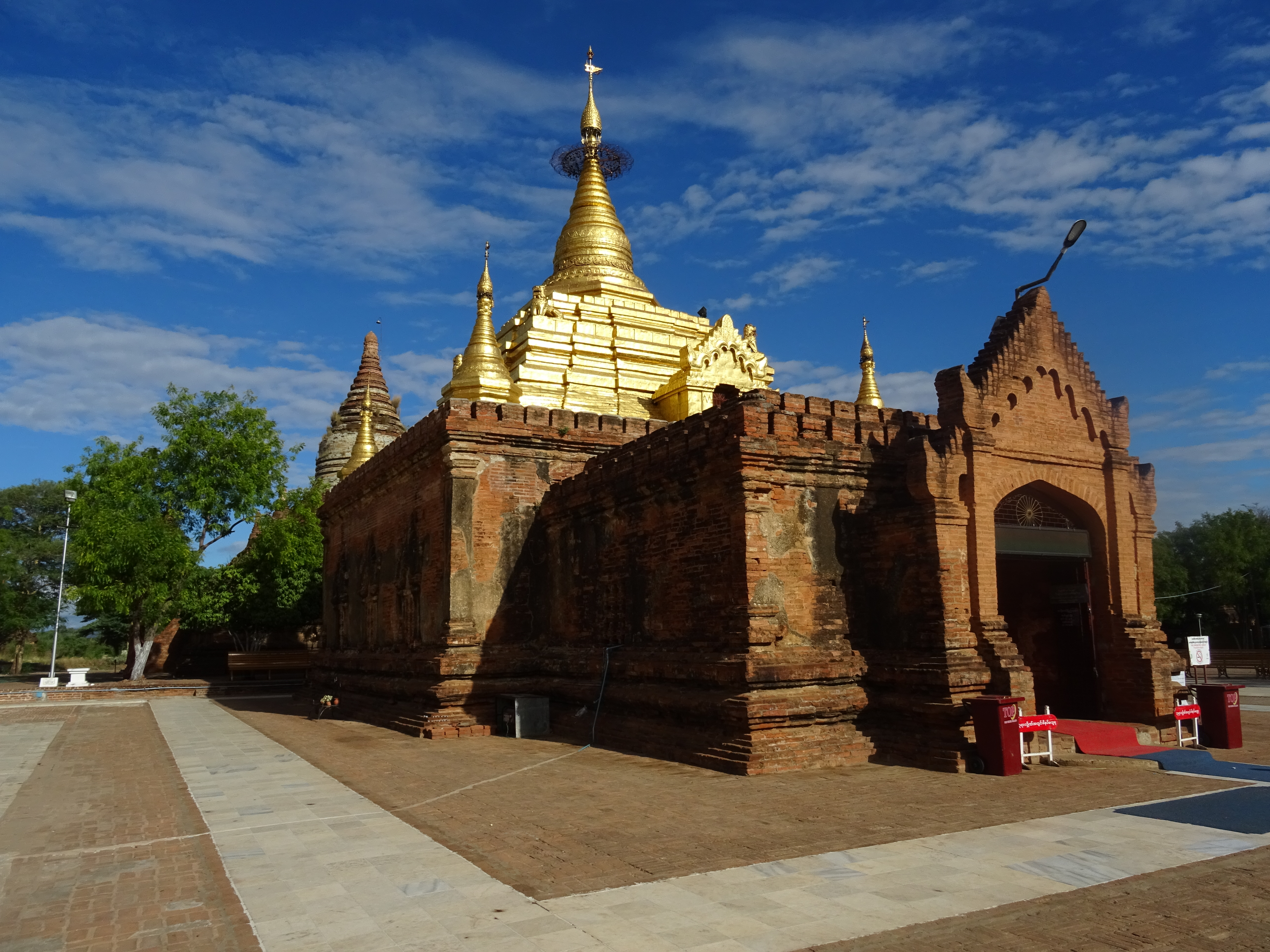

Religion
- Affiliation: Buddhism
- Sect: Theravada Buddhism
- Status: active

Location
- Location: Bagan, Myanmar
- Country: Myanmar
- Interactive map of Alo-daw Pyi Pagoda

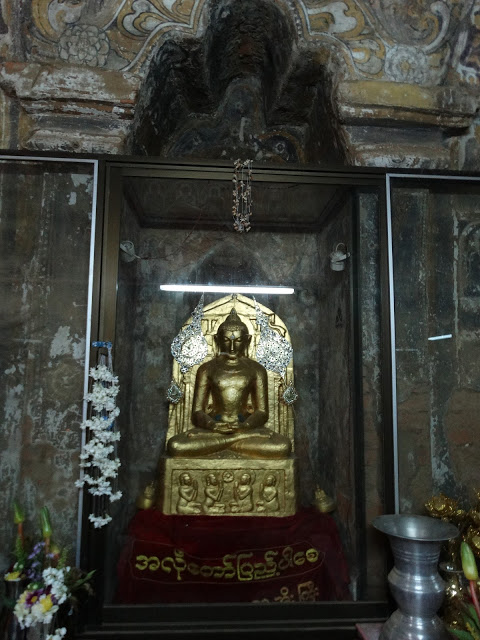
Buddha with diamonds in the Alodawpyi Pagoda

The Alo-daw Pyi Pagoda, also known as the Alodawpyi Pagoda or Alodawpyay Pagoda, is a Buddhist temple in Bagan, Mandalay Region, Myanmar. Built in the early 12th century, the temple is notable for its old structure and a number of fresco paintings. The temple has been the subject of restorative efforts funded by donations given by General Khin Nyunt—since 1994, and is a popular pilgrimage site. The temple's name translates to "wish-fulfilling".
