= Dharmarakṣita (9th century) =

Dharmarakṣita is a c. 9th century Indian Buddhist credited with composing an important Mahayana text called the Wheel of Sharp Weapons (Tib. blo-sbyong mtshon-cha 'khor-lo). He was the teacher of Atiśa, who was instrumental in establishing a second wave of Buddhism in Tibet.

'Wheel of Sharp Weapons' is an abbreviated title for 'The Wheel of Sharp Weapons Effectively Striking the Heart of the Foe.' This text is often referenced as a detailed source for how the laws of karma play out in our lives; it reveals many specific effects and their causes. A poetic presentation, the "wheel of sharp weapons" can be visualized as something we throw out or propel, which then comes back to cut us... something like a boomerang. In the same way, Dharmarakṣita explains, the non-virtuous causes we create through our self-interested behavior come back to 'cut us' in future lives as the ripening of the negative karma such actions create. This, he explains, is the source of all our pain and suffering. He admonishes that it is our own selfishness or self-cherishing that leads us to harm others, which in turn creates the negative karma or potential for future suffering. Our suffering is not a punishment, merely a self-created karmic result. In most verses, Dharmarakṣita also offers a suggested alternative virtuous or positive action to substitute for our previous non-virtuous behavior, actions that will create positive karma and future pleasant conditions and happiness.

According to the Wheel of Sharp Weapons, the way to make an end of this cycle is to understand how this process comes about and how it is rooted in the grasping at a self or "I". When we contemplate how our actions, rooted in the sense of self and other, cause suffering, then we use these very negative actions we have done in the past as a contemplative "weapon" to attack self grasping, the real "foe" in our lives. Thus, the weapon which harms us is turned against the heart or source of our suffering, our "true enemy". This explains the meaning of the full title The Wheel of Sharp Weapons Effectively Striking the Heart of the Foe.

Despite the fact that Wheel of Sharp Weapons has come to be considered a Mahayana text, Dharmarakṣita is said to have subscribed to the Vaibhāṣika view. His authorship of the text is considered questionable by scholars for various reasons.
