= Tantkyitaung Pagoda =

Buddhist Pagoda in Pakokku, Myanmar

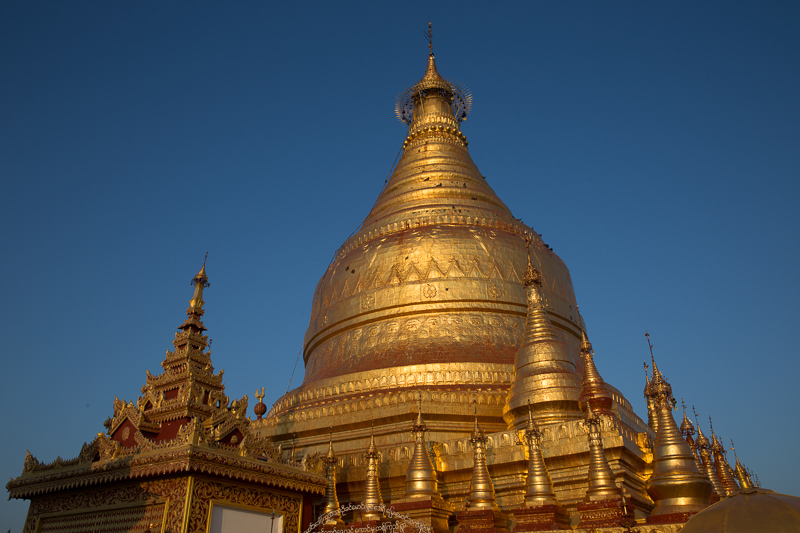

- Location within Myanmar

Religion
- Affiliation: Theravada Buddhism

Location
- Country: Myanmar
- Coordinates: 21.155358°N 94.787859°E

Architecture
- Founder: King Anawrahta
- Completed: 397 ME (1035 CE)

Tantkyitaung Pagoda (Burmese: တန့်ကြည့်တောင်စေတီ), located across the Ayeyarwady River in Pakokku District, Magway Division, Myanmar (Burma) is a prominent Burmese Buddhist pagoda near the historic city of Bagan, believed to enshrine four tooth relics of Gautama Buddha.

It was built by King Anawrahta in 397 ME (1035 CE) on Tantkyi Hill, where the royal white elephant bearing the tooth relics rested for the second time, after it sat at a place, marked by Shin Myethna Thettawshay Pagoda, then at a place where heavy rains fell, marked by Shin Mogaung Pagoda, and at a place where the elephant mustered its strength, marked by Sin Min Thwin Pagoda.

Tantkyitaung Pagoda is 90 feet (27 m) high with the base of 60 feet (18 m). Its nine tiers of umbrella contain a silver vane and the diamond bud. It has been renovated in successive periods. It has a depiction of the Buddha, a statue of Ananda and that of the forest guardian. A look down from the pagoda platform reveals the head of a dragon protruding from the walling down below. It is said that the tail end of this likeness of the dragon is around the site of Shwezigon Pagoda.
