= Payathonzu Temple =

Buddhist temple in Bagan, Myanmar

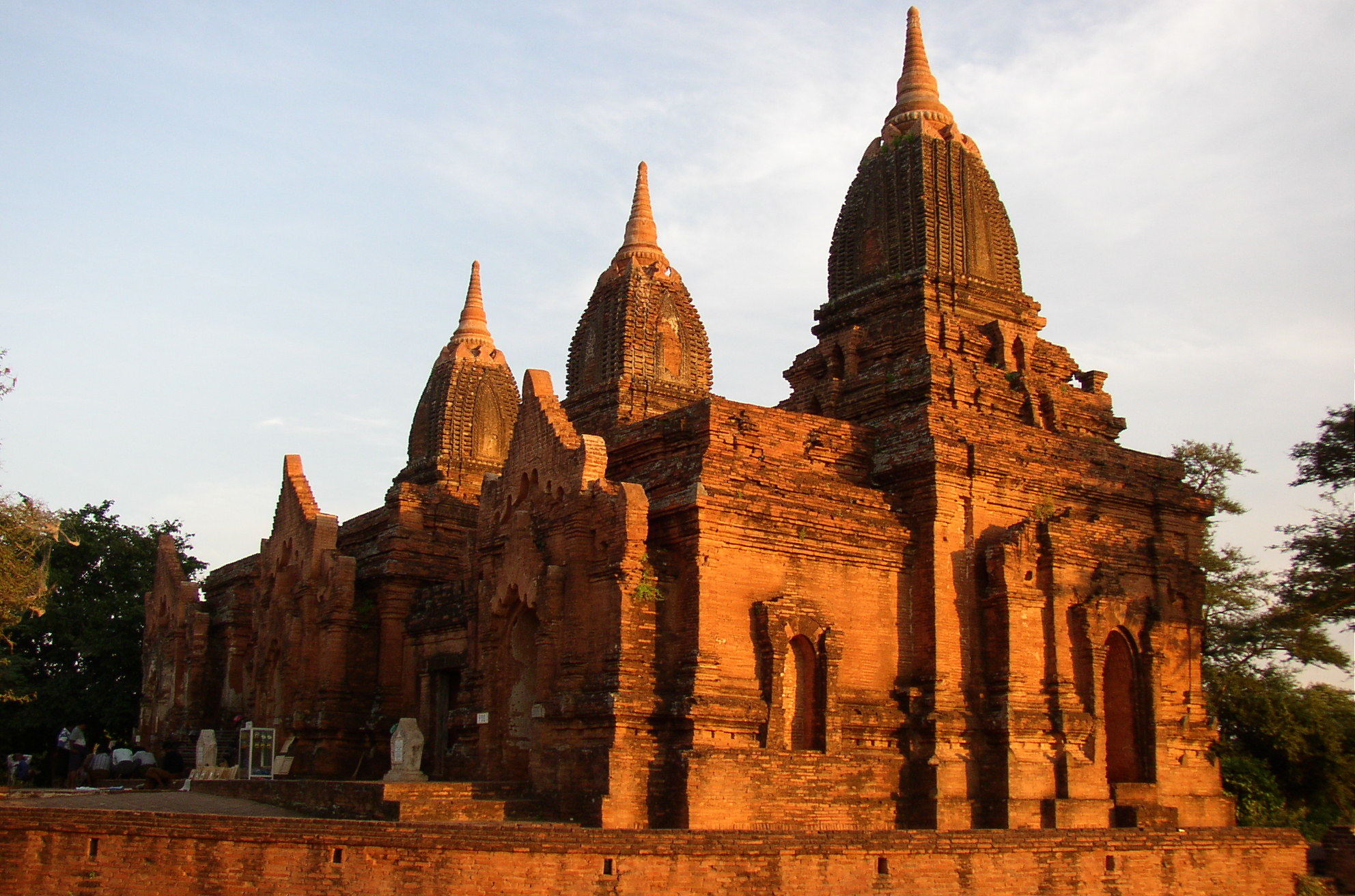
- The Payathonzu Temple (2005)

- Location within Myanmar

Religion
- Affiliation: Theravada Buddhism

Location
- Location: Minnanthu village, Mandalay Region
- Country: Myanmar
- Coordinates: 21°9′44″N 94°54′12″E

The Payathonzu Temple (Burmese: ဘုရားသုံးဆူ [pʰəjá θóʊɰ̃ zù]; literally 'Temple of Three Buddhas') is a Buddhist temple located in the village of Minnanthu (southeast of Bagan) in Myanmar. It is unique because it consists of three temples conjoined through narrow passages. The structure dates from the latter part of the 13th century. The interior of the temple contains frescoes, believed to be Mahayana and Tantric in style. However, this style applies only to the decorative elements, and may have been added by skilled workers from northern India or Nepal. The temple was not completed. The temple was renovated after being damaged by a 2016 earthquake, with the completion of the three stupas atop the temple, which are lighter in colour.
