= Thai temple art and architecture =

Art and architecture of Buddhist temples in Thailand

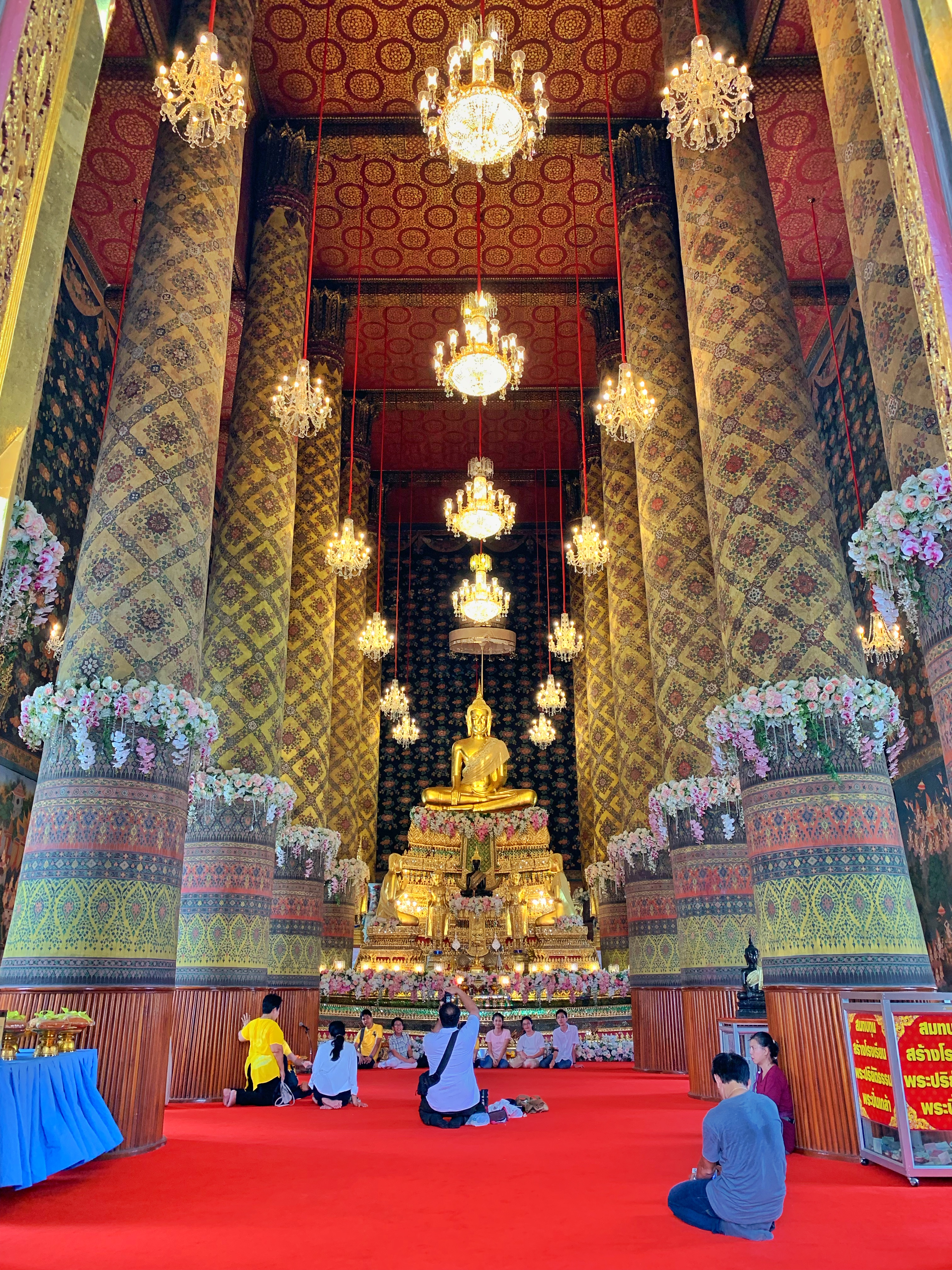
Interior of Ubosot of Wat Hong Rattanaram, Bangkok

Thai temple art and architecture is the art and architecture of Buddhist temples in Thailand. Temples are known as wats, from the Pāḷi vāṭa, meaning "enclosure". A temple has an enclosing wall that divides it from the secular world. Temples served as a stabilizing center in these communities because their sacred teachings became a basis of authority and boundaries, their precincts became places of instruction, their regimes of common ownership of property formed them into economic centers, and their functions allowed them to serve at the heart of these communities in a variety of ways.

== Architecture ==
Wat architecture adheres to consistent principles. A wat, with few exceptions, consists of two parts: the Phutthawat and the Sangkhawat.

=== Phutthawat ===
The Phutthawat (Thai: พุทธาวาส) is the area which is dedicated to Buddha. It generally contains several buildings:

- Chedi (Thai: เจดีย์) – also known as a Stupa it is mostly in the form of a bell-shaped tower, often accessible and covered with gold leaf, containing a relic chamber.
- Prang (Thai: ปรางค์) – the Thai version of Khmer temple towers, mostly in temples from the Sukhothai and the Ayutthaya period.
- Ubosot or Bot (Thai: อุโบสถ or Thai: โบสถ์) – the ordination hall and most sacred area of a wat. Eight Sema stones (Bai Sema, Thai: ใบเสมา) mark the consecrated area.
- Wihan (Thai: วิหาร) – a shrine hall that contains the principal Buddha images. It is the assembly hall where monks and laypeople congregate.
- Mondop (Thai: มณฑป) - specific square- or cruciform-based building or shrine, sometimes with a spired roof. It is a ceremonial form that can be appear on different kinds of buildings. It can house relics, sacred scriptures or act as a shrine. Unlike the Mandapa of Khmer or Indian temple, which are part of a larger structure, the Thai Mondop is free-standing.
- Ho trai (Thai: หอไตร) – the temple library or scriptures depository houses the sacred Tipiṭaka scriptures. Sometimes they are built in the form of a Mondop (Thai: พระมณฑป), a cubical-shaped building where the pyramidal roof is carried by columns.
- Sala (Thai: ศาลา) – an open pavilion providing shade and a place to rest.
- Sala kan parian (Thai: ศาลาการเปรียญ) – a large, open hall where laity can hear sermons or receive religious education. It literally means "hall, in which monks study for their Parian exam" and is used for chanting afternoon prayers.
- Ho rakhang (Thai: หอระฆัง) – bell tower that is used for waking the monks and to announce the morning and evening ceremonies.
- Phra rabiang (Thai: พระระเบียง) – a peristyle sometimes built around the sacred inner area as a cloister.
- Ancillary buildings such as a crematorium or a school.

The buildings are often adorned with elements such as chofas.

In temples of the Rattanakosin era, such as Wat Pho and Wat Ratchabophit, the ubosot can be contained within a (low) inner wall called a Kamphaeng Kaeo (Thai: กำแพงแก้ว), which translates as "crystal wall".

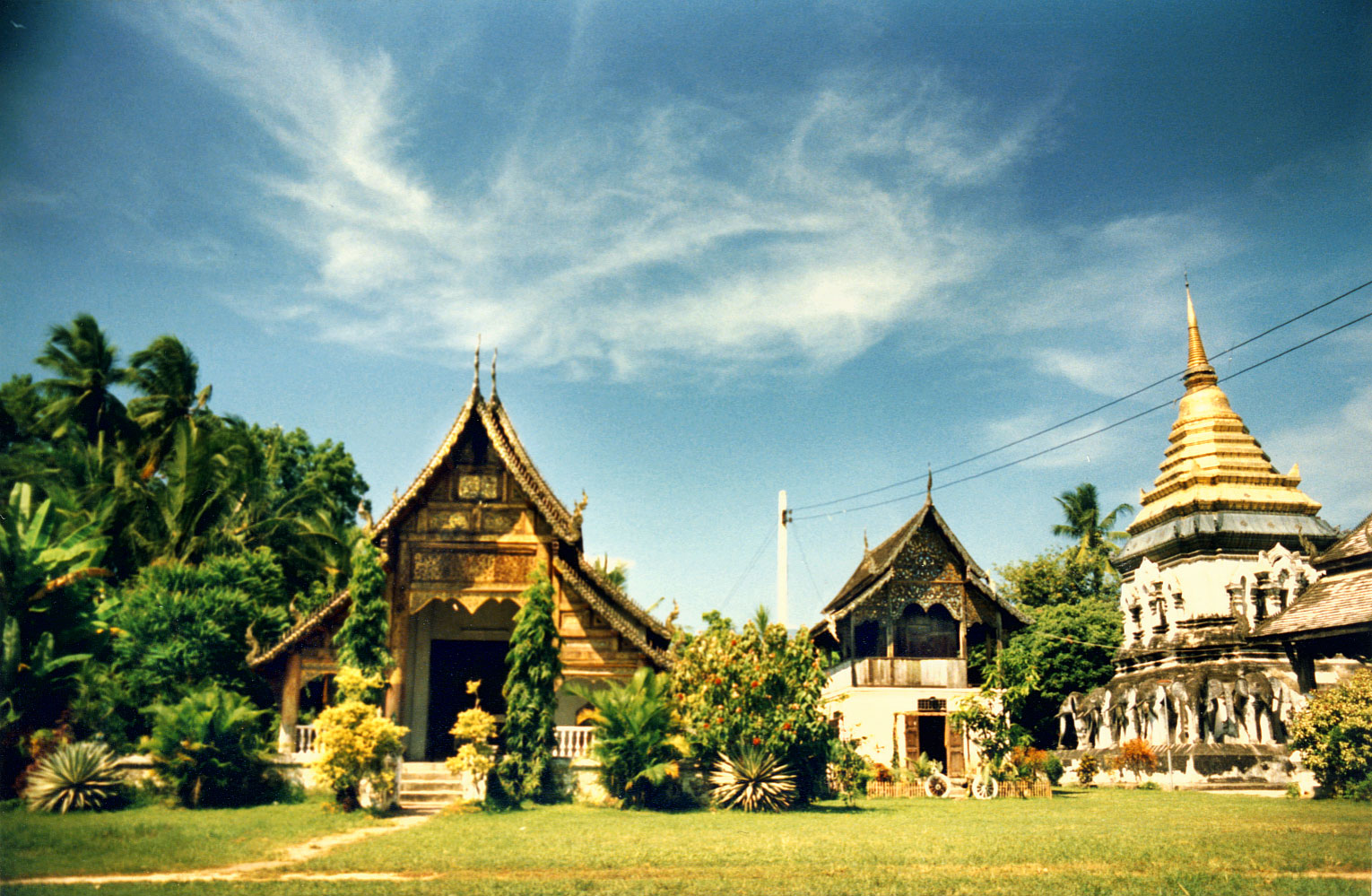
Ubosot, Ho Trai and Chedi (from left to right) of Wat Chiang Man, built in Lanna architecture

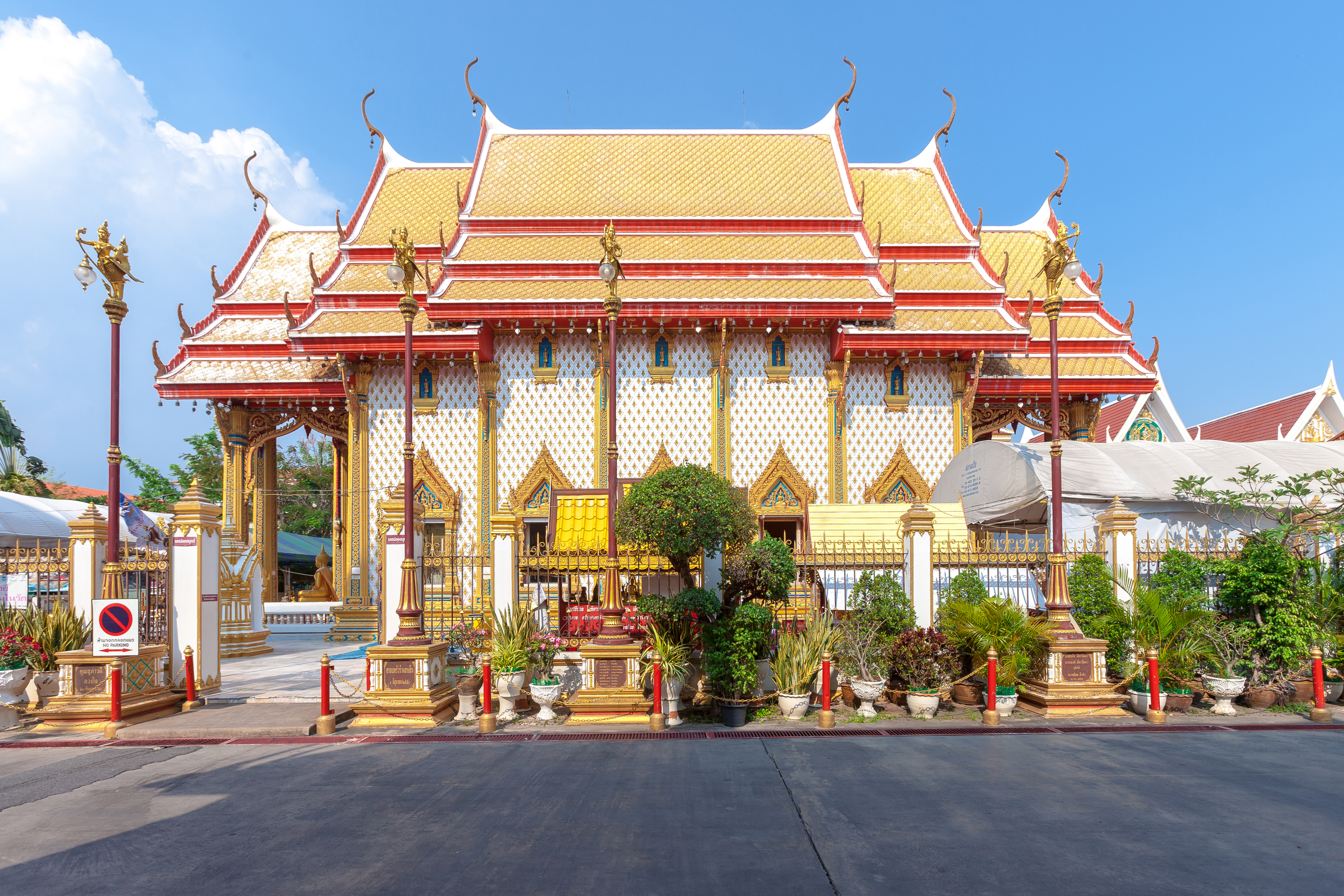
Ubosot of Wat Nimmanoradi, Bangkok

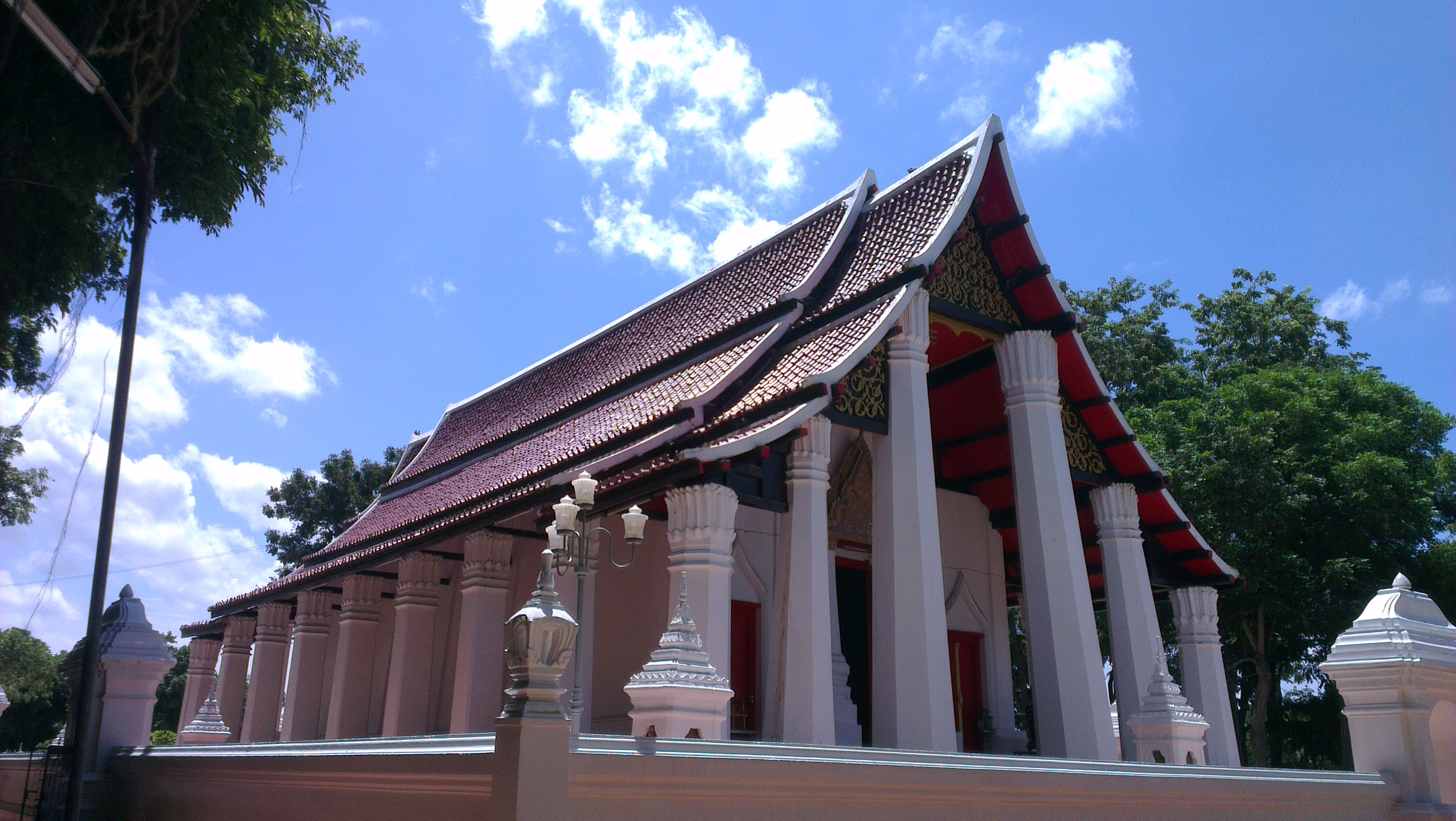
An ancient Ayutthaya-style Ubosot without Chofas located at Wat Oi, Ang Thong, similar to Ubosot of Wat Phutthaisawan, Phra Nakhon Si Ayutthaya

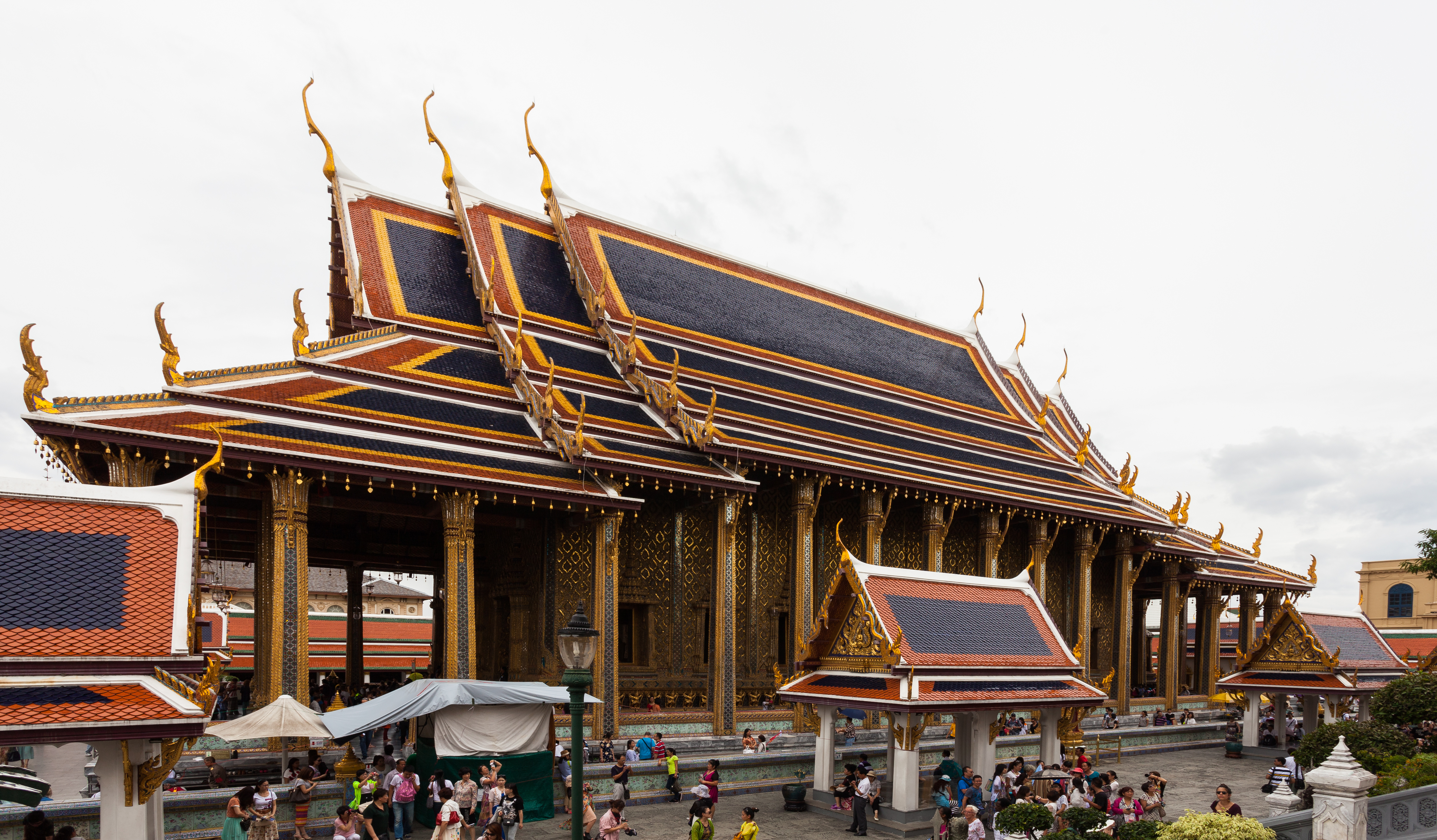
Ubosot with multiple front roof located at Wat Phra Kaew, Bangkok

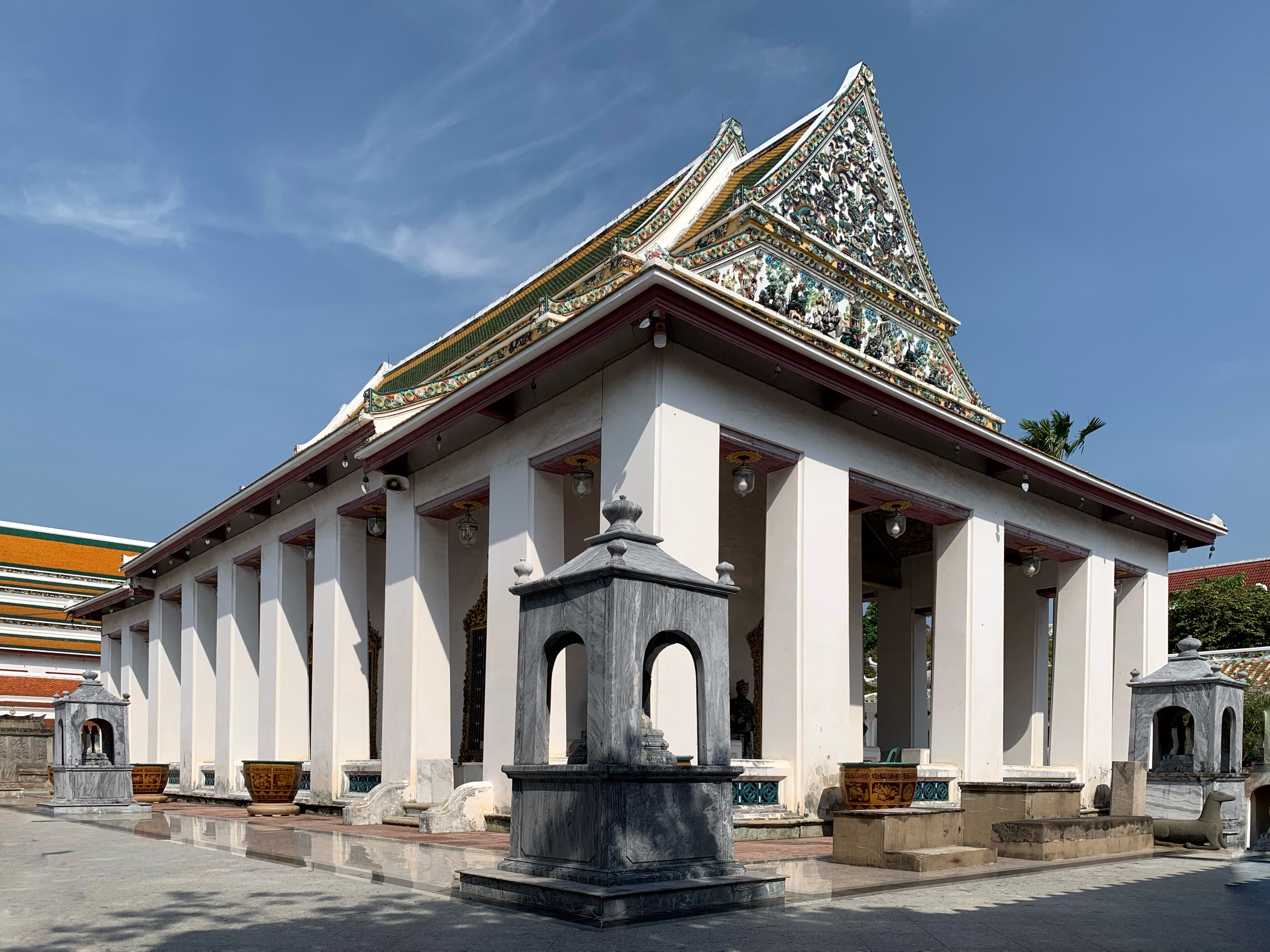
Thai-Chinese Ubosot rebuilt in King Rama III period, single front roof, without Chofas located at Wat Ratchaorasaram, Bangkok

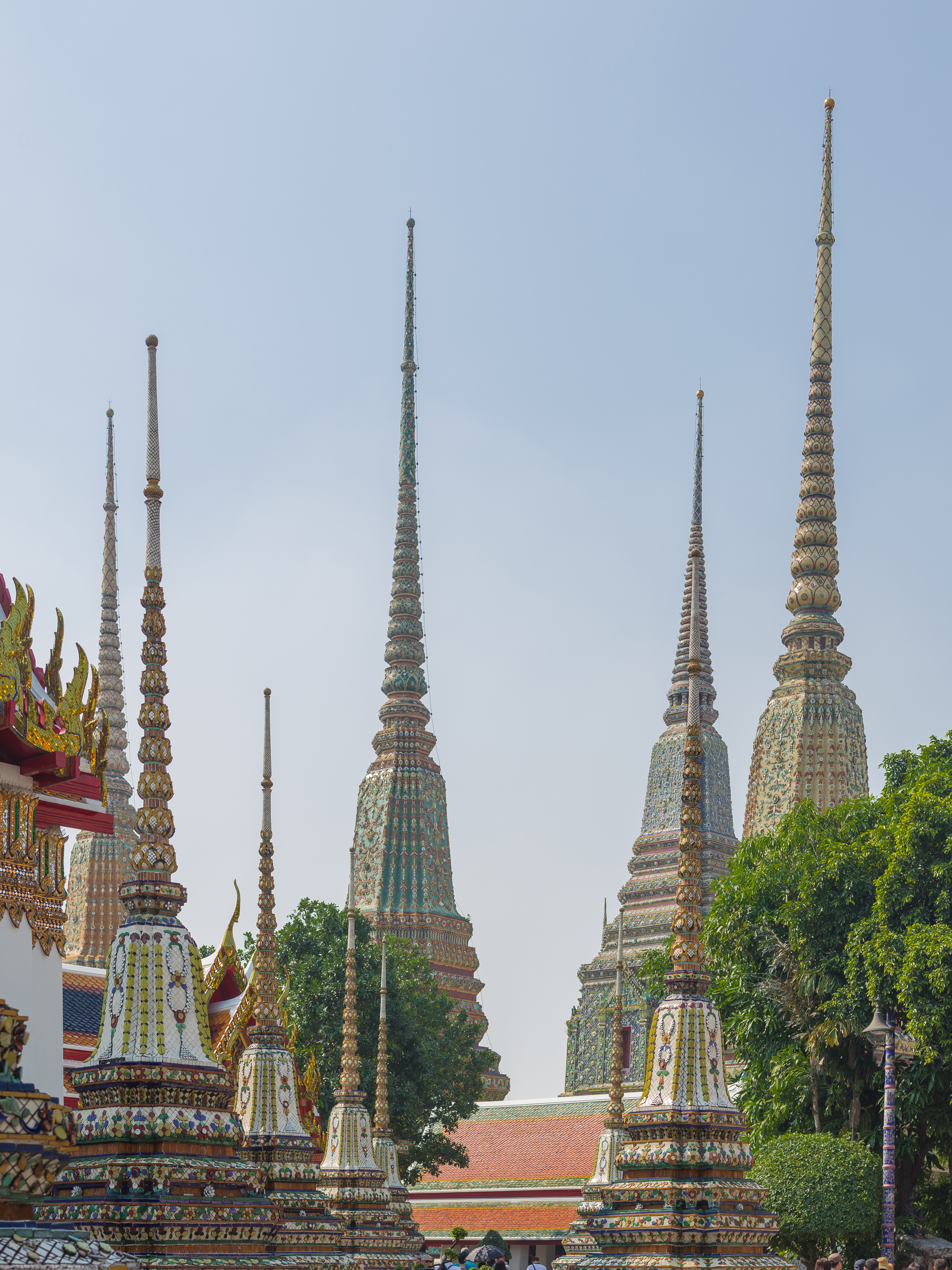
Chedi of Wat Pho, Bangkok

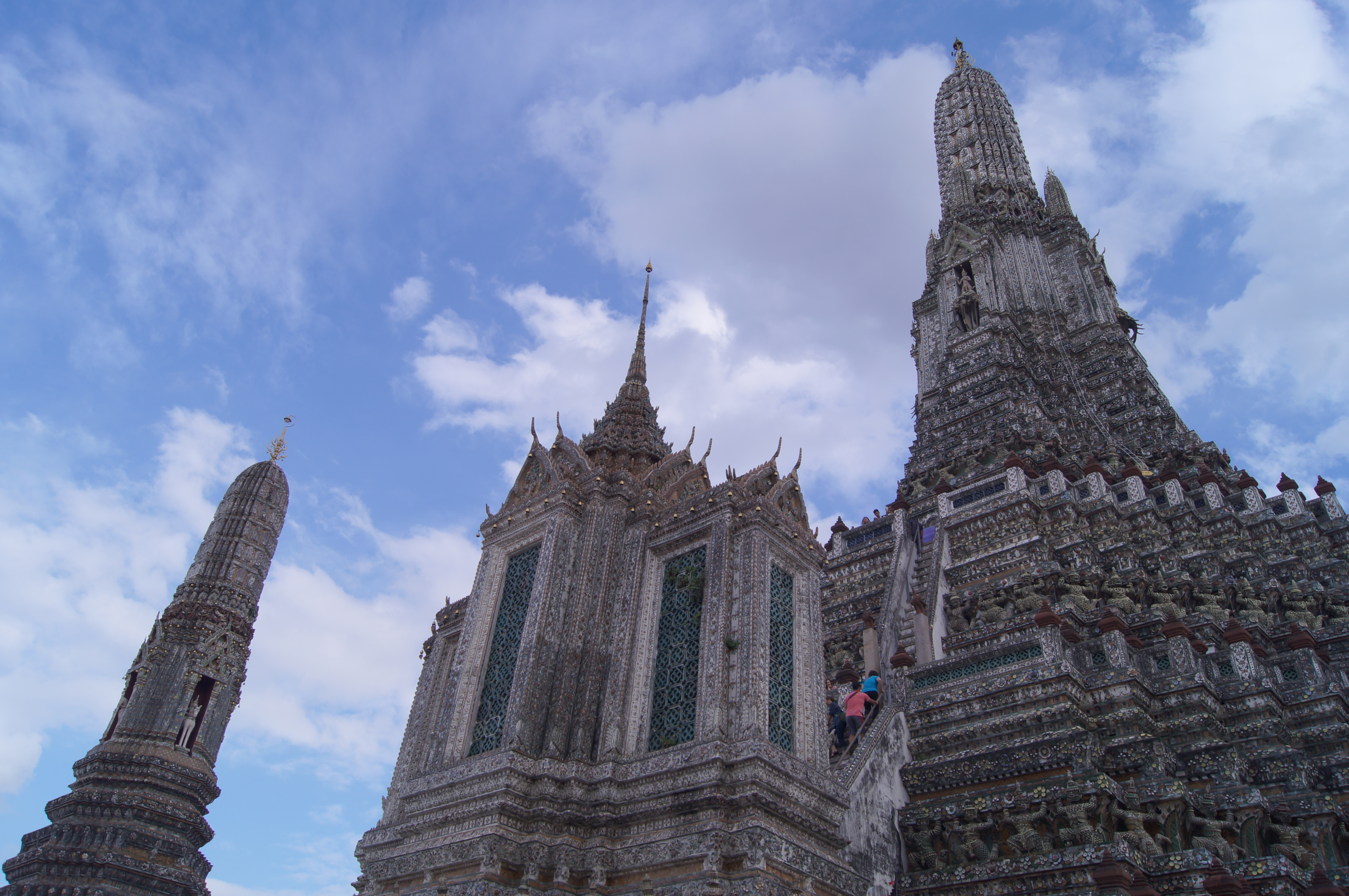
Prang of Wat Arun, Bangkok

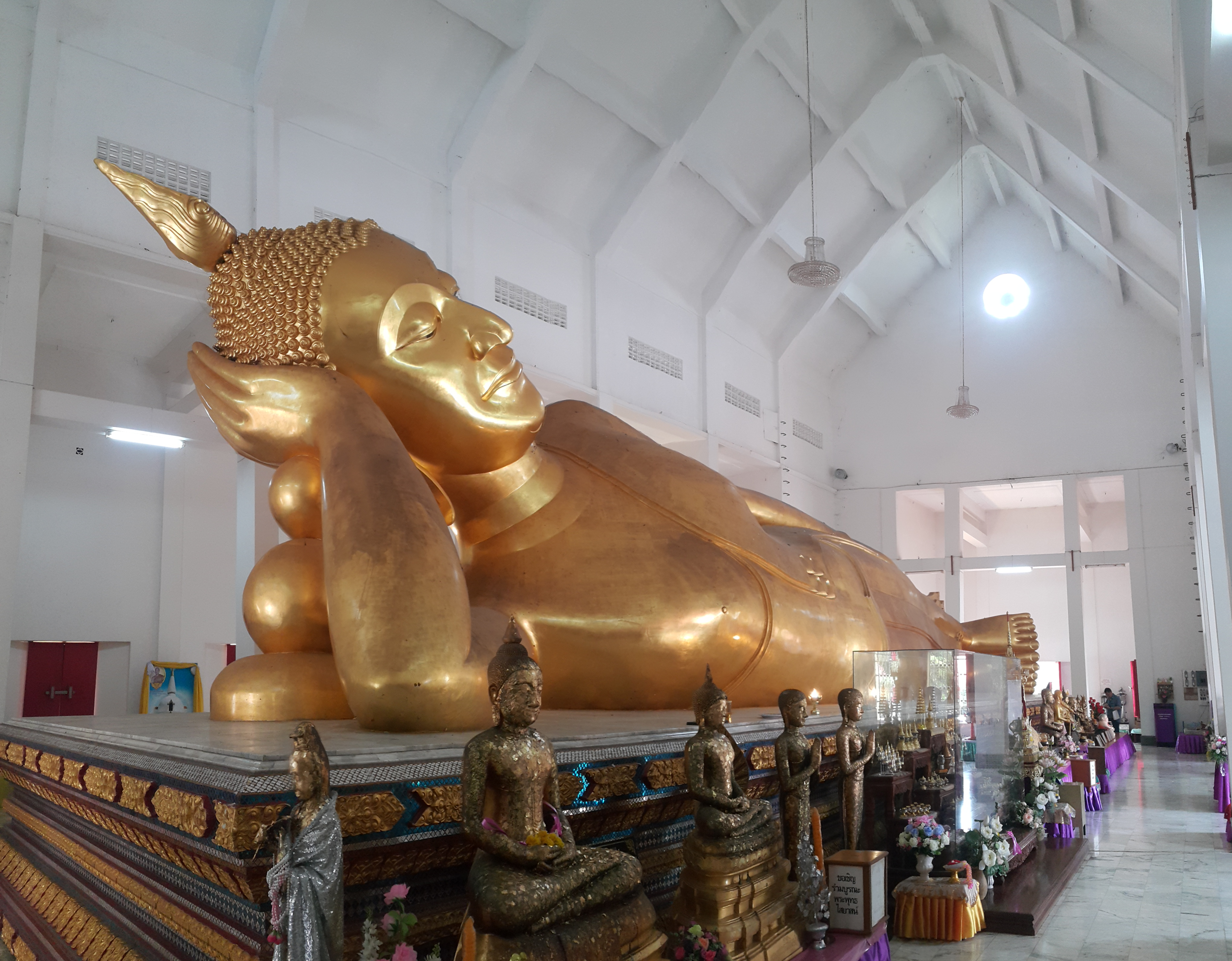
Reclining Buddha inside Wihan Phra Non (Wihan of Reclining Buddha) of Wat Phai Lom, Chanthaburi

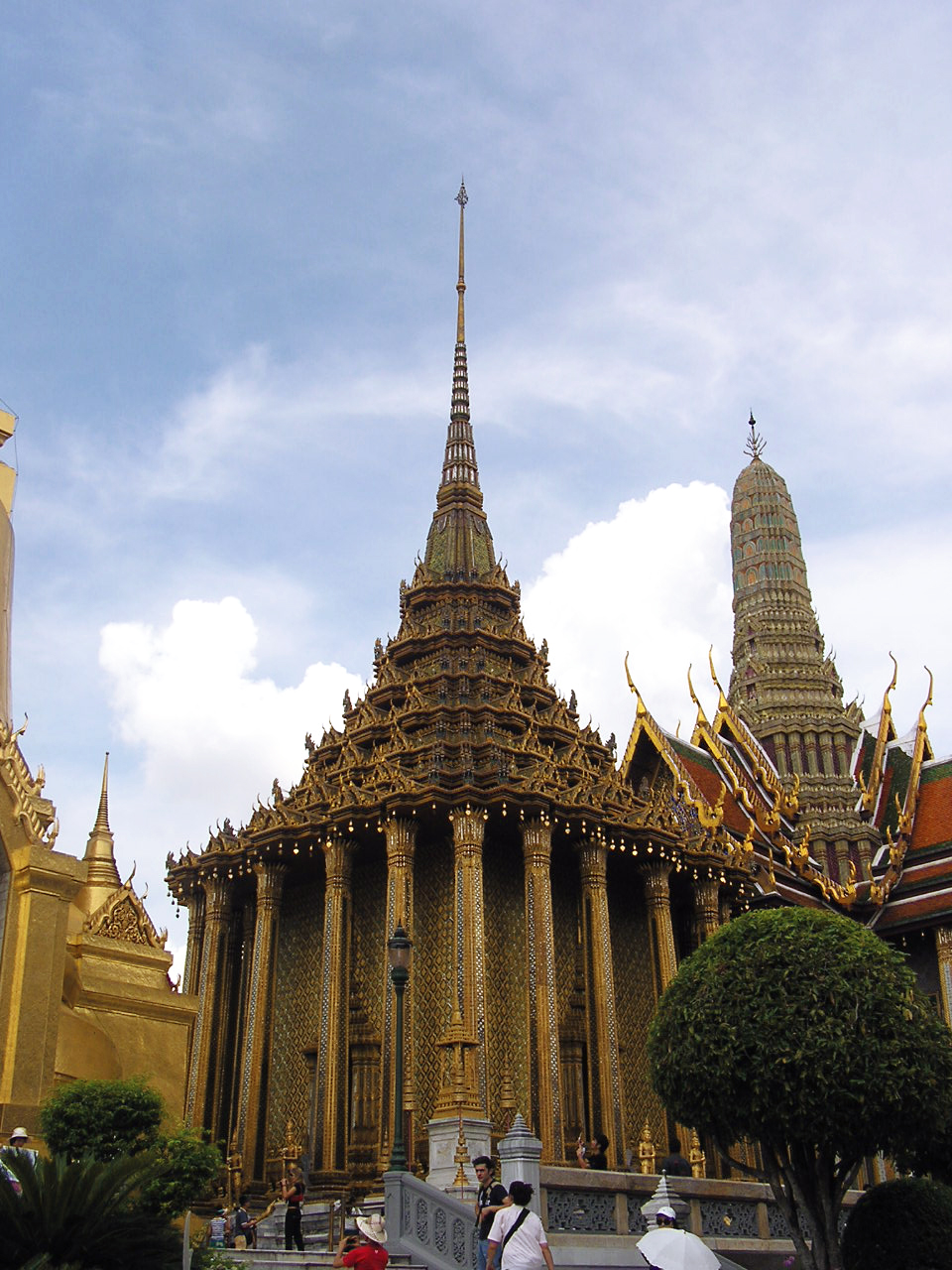
Mondop of Wat Phra Kaew, Bangkok

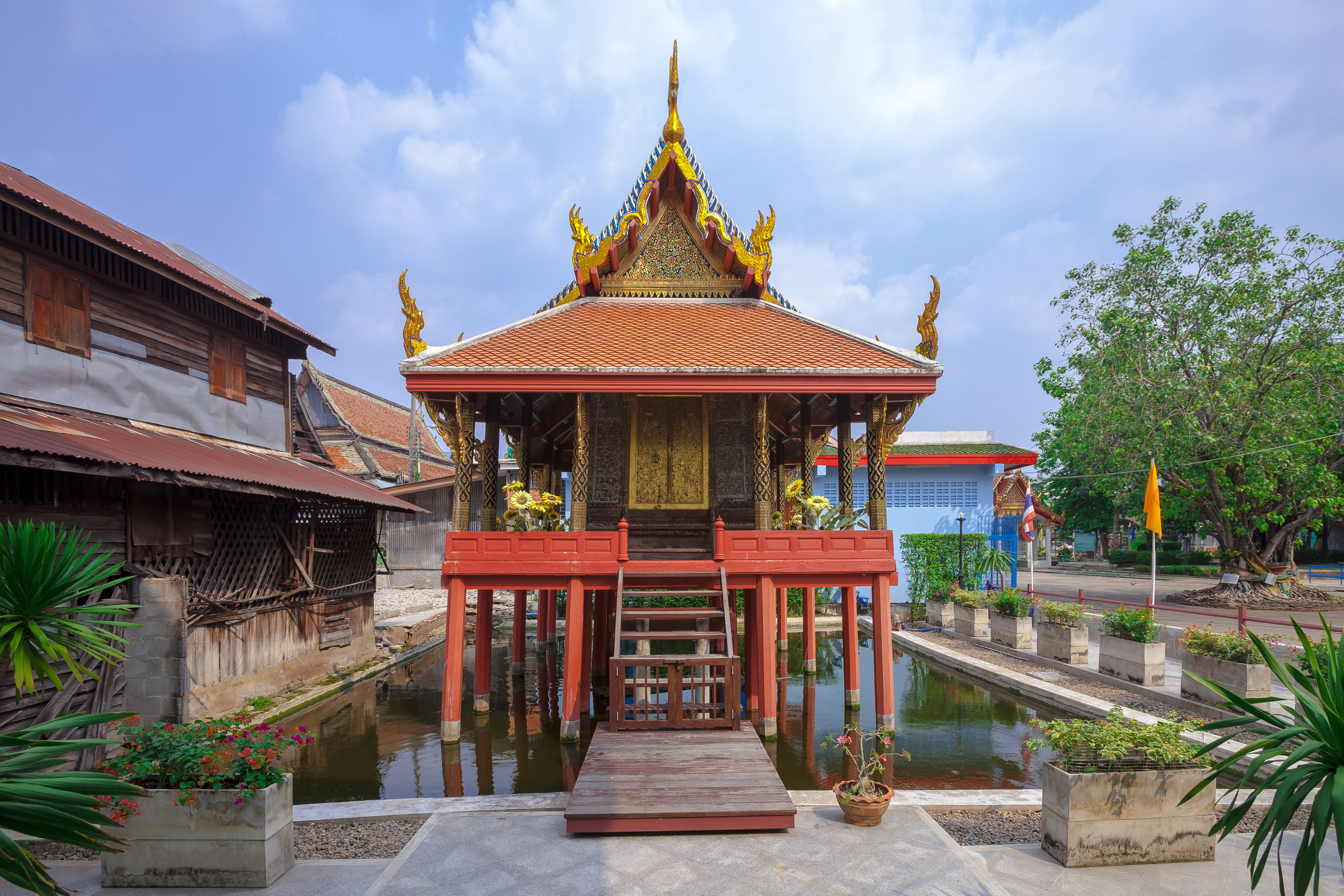
Ho Trai of Wat Apson Sawan, Bangkok

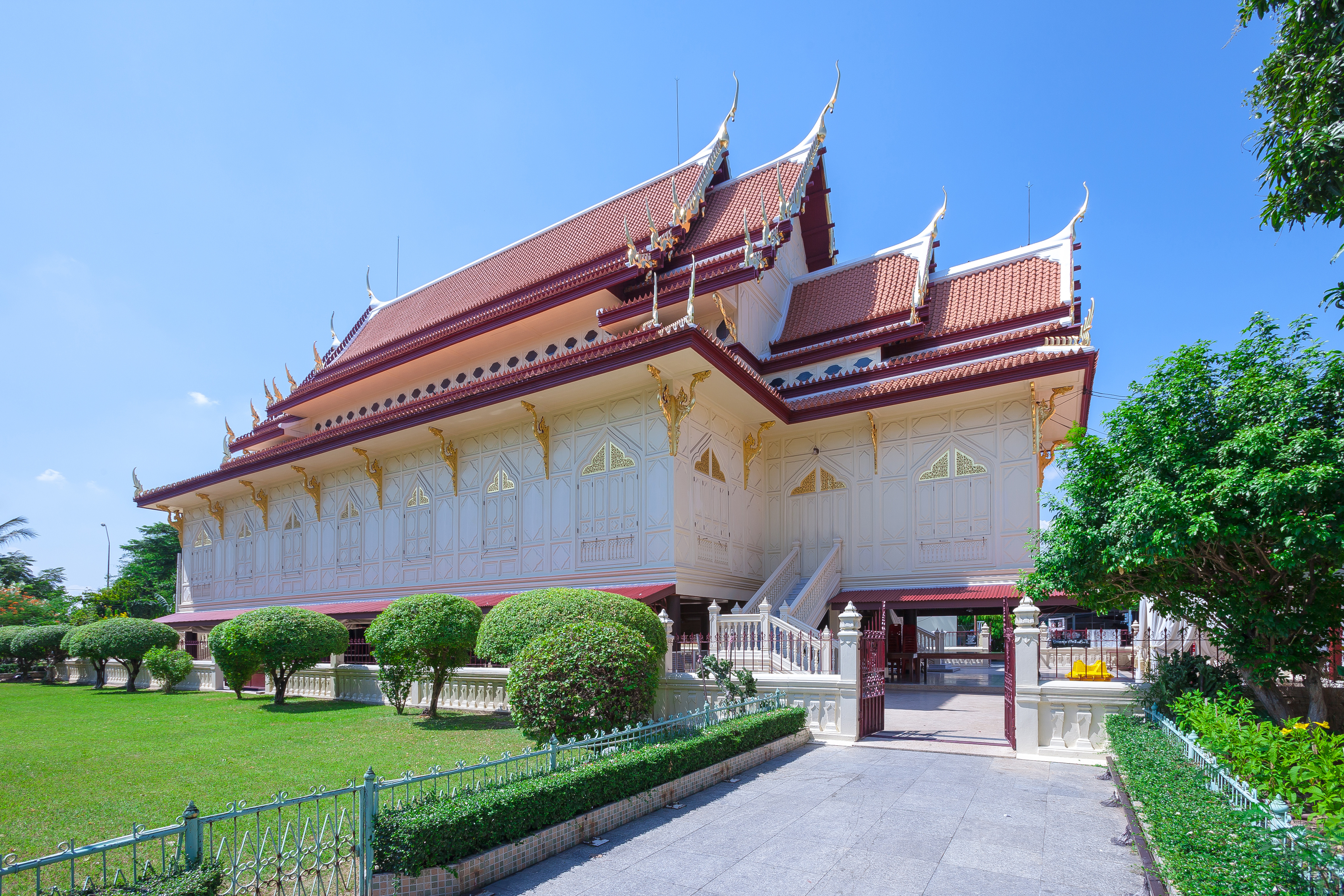
Sermon hall of Wat Rachathiwat, Bangkok

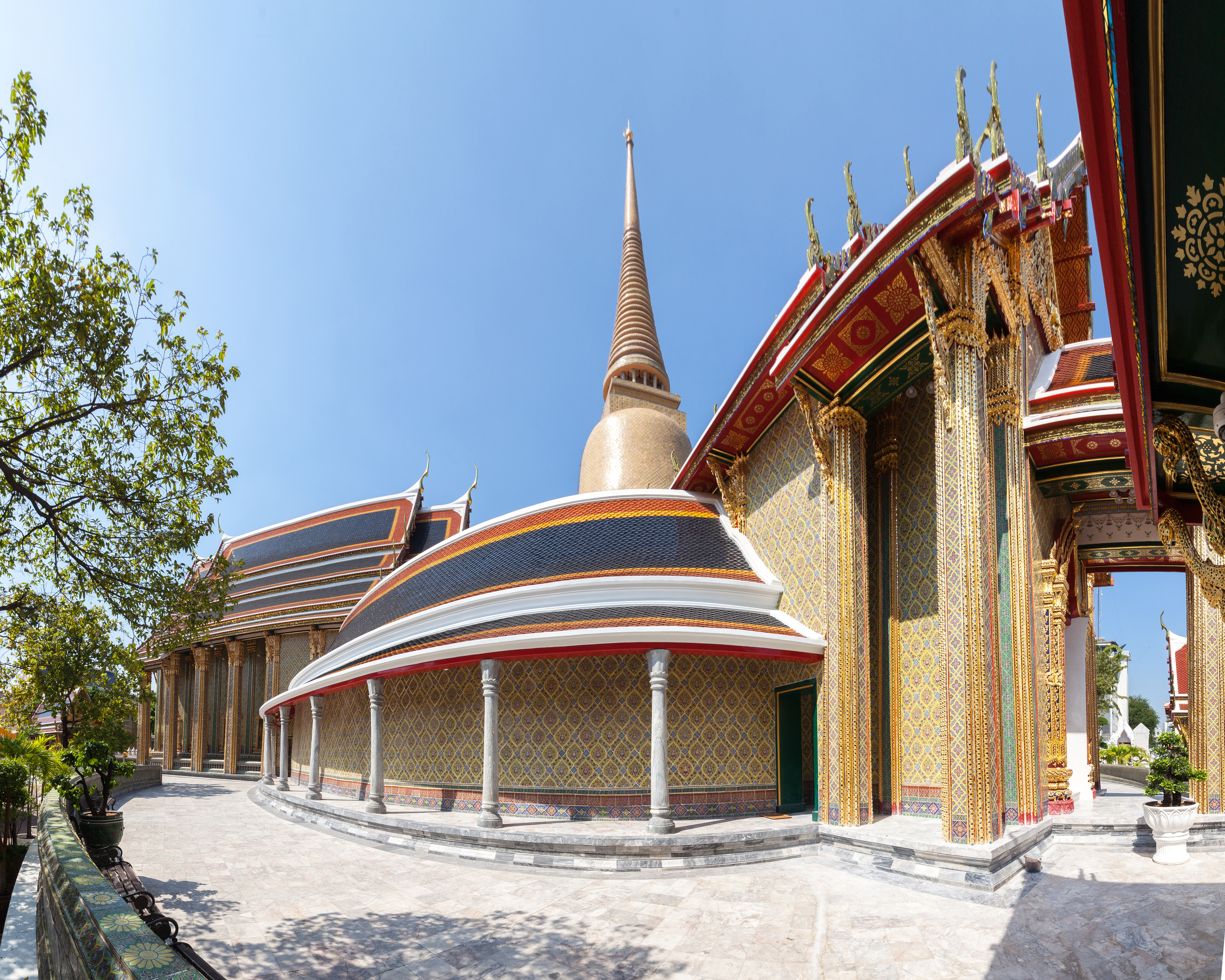
Wat Ratchabopit, Bangkok

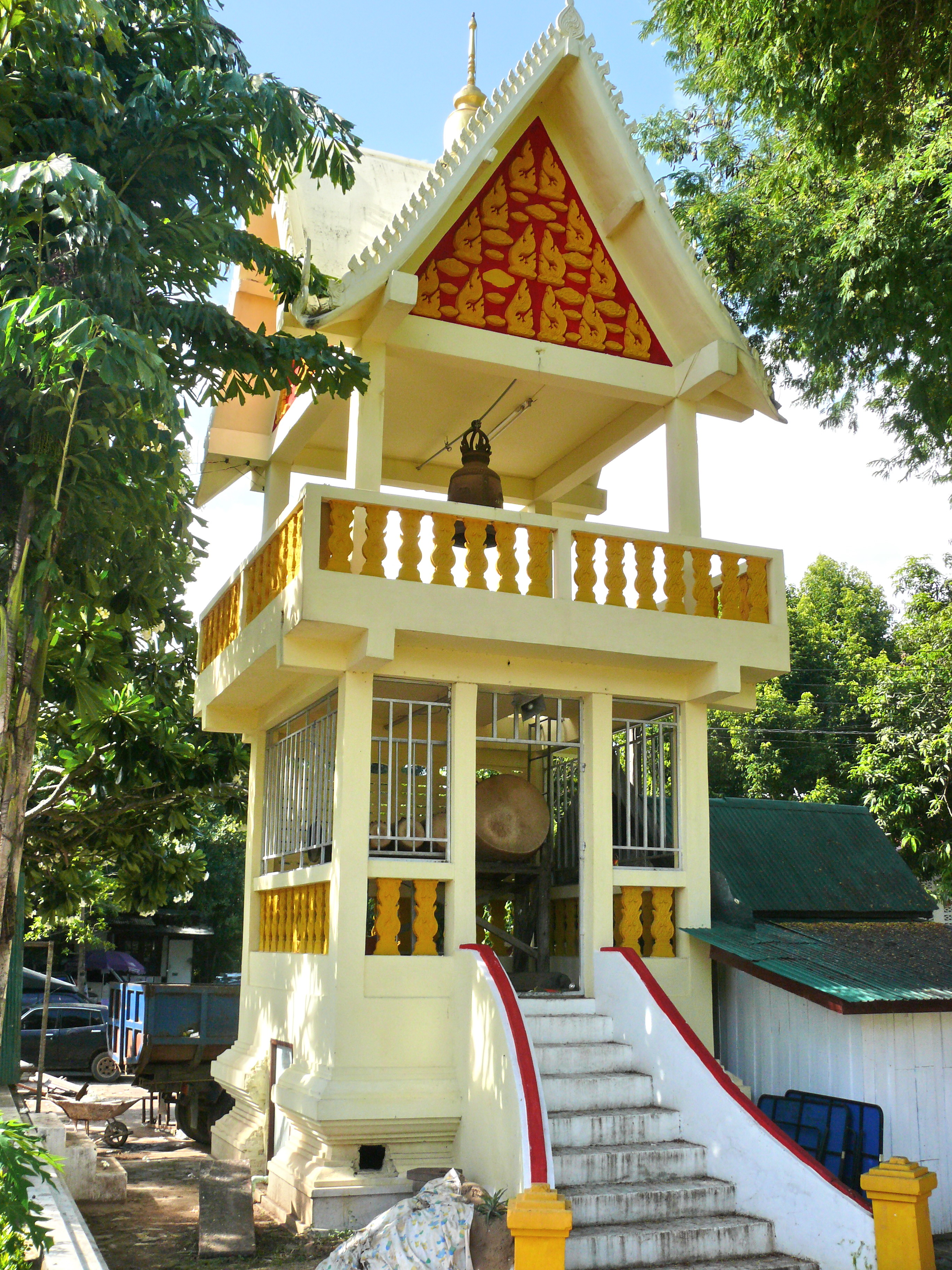
Ho Rakhang of Wat Phra That Chang Kham, Nan

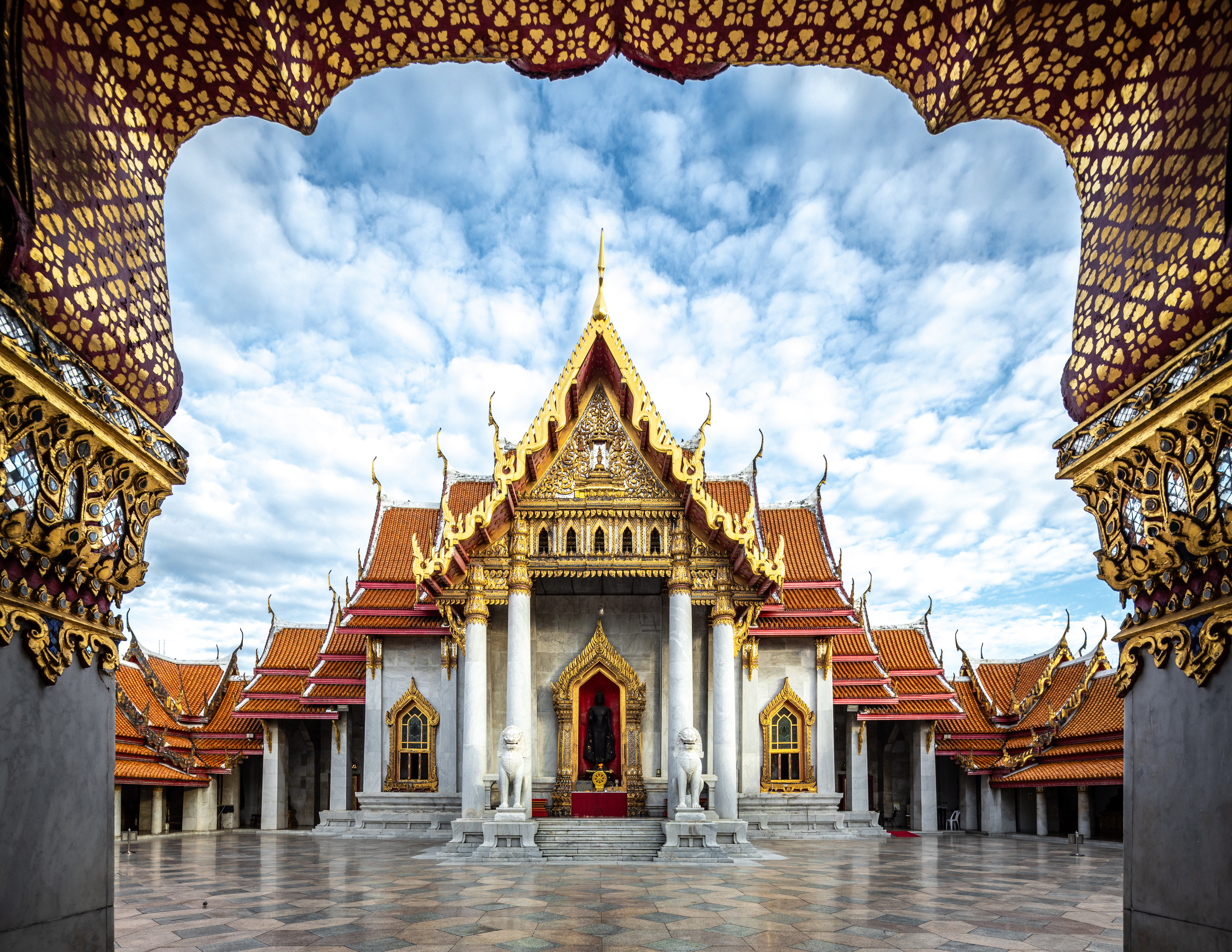
Ubosot of Wat Benchamabophit, Bangkok

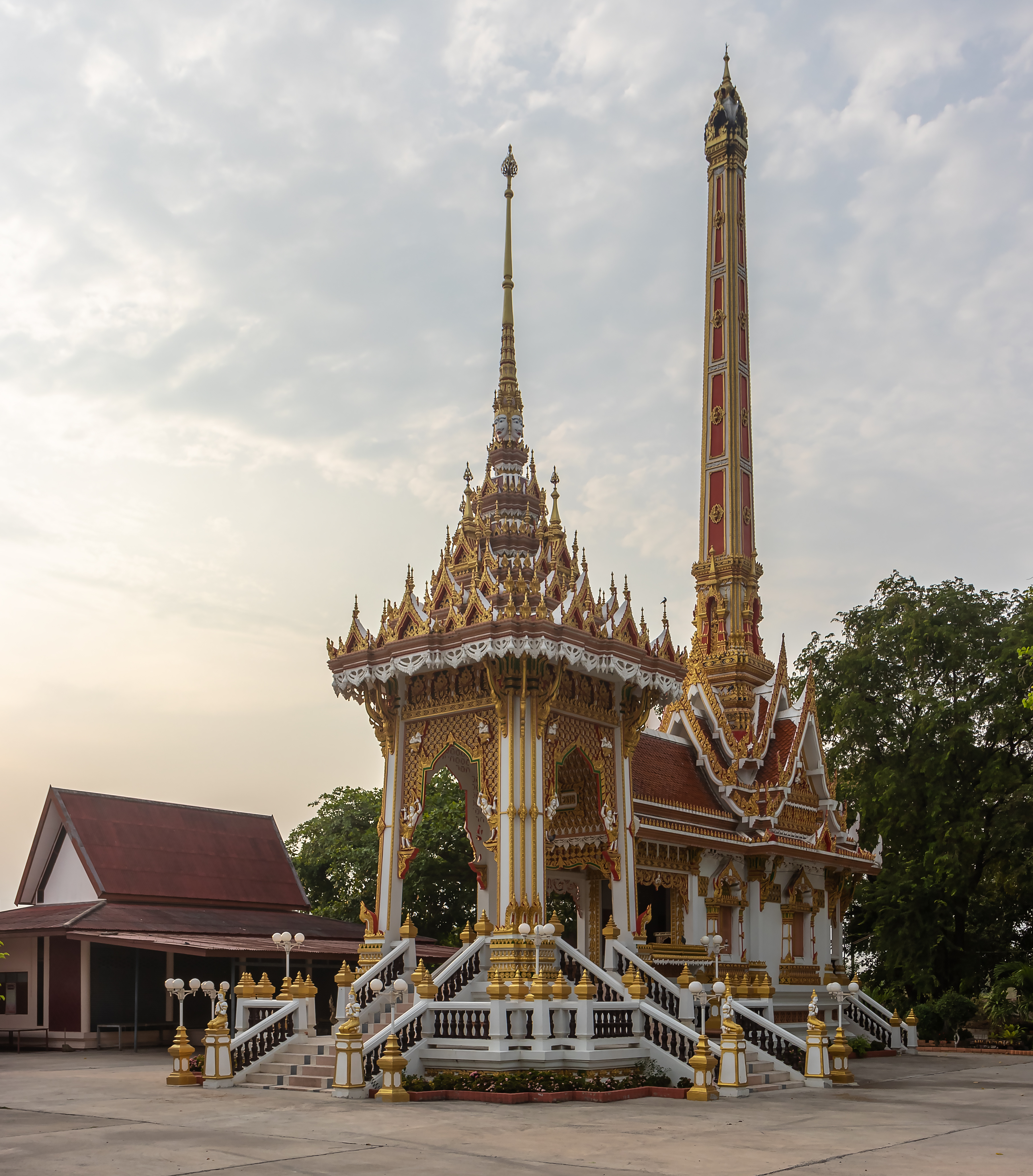
Crematoria of Wat Phanom Yong, Ayuthhaya

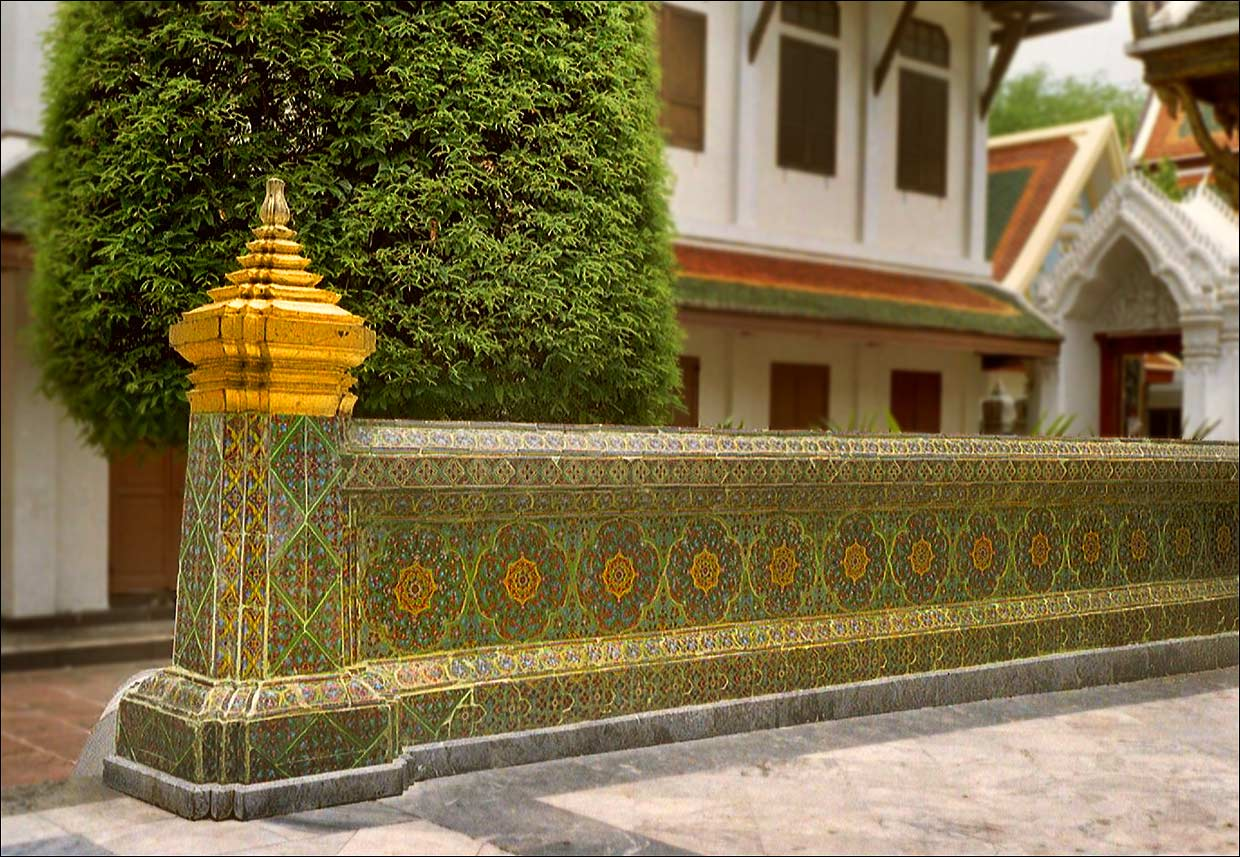
Kamphaeng Kaeo surrounding the Ubosot of Wat Ratchabophit, Bangkok

=== Sangkhawat ===
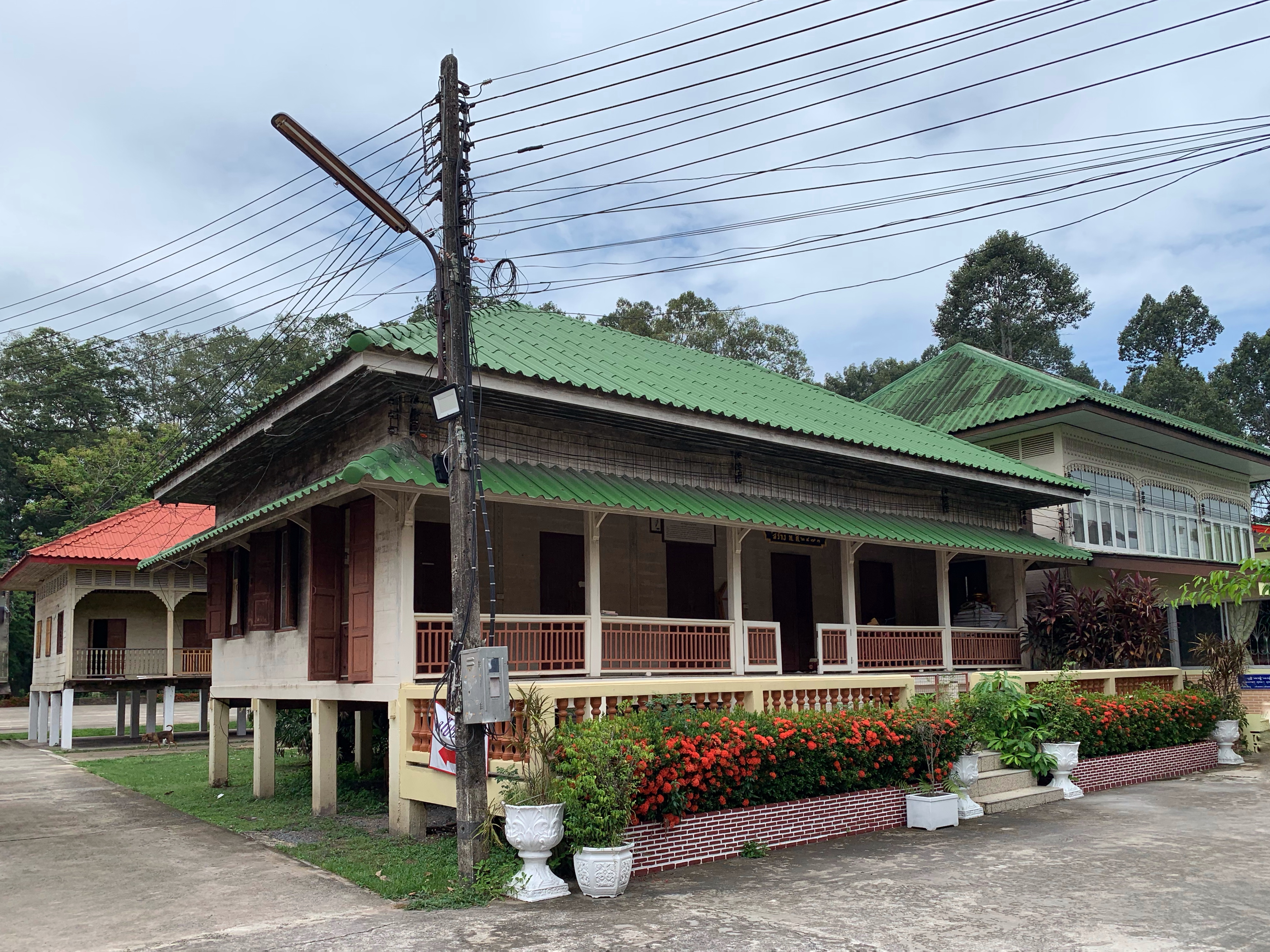
Various Kuti buildings of Wat Udom Thani, Nakhon Nayok

The sangkhawat (Thai: สังฆาวาส) contains the monks' living quarters. It lies within the wall surrounding the temple compound. The sangkhawat can have the following buildings:

- Kuti (Thai: กุฏิ) – originally a small structure, built on stilts, designed to house a monk, with its proper size defined in the Sangkhathiset, rule 6, to be 12 by 7 kheup (4.013 by 2.343 meters). Modern kutis take the shape of an apartment building with small rooms.
- The sangkhawat can contain the 'Ho rakhang' (bell tower) and even the 'Sala Kan Parian' (sermon hall).
- Houses most of the functional buildings such as the kitchen.

== Temple elements ==
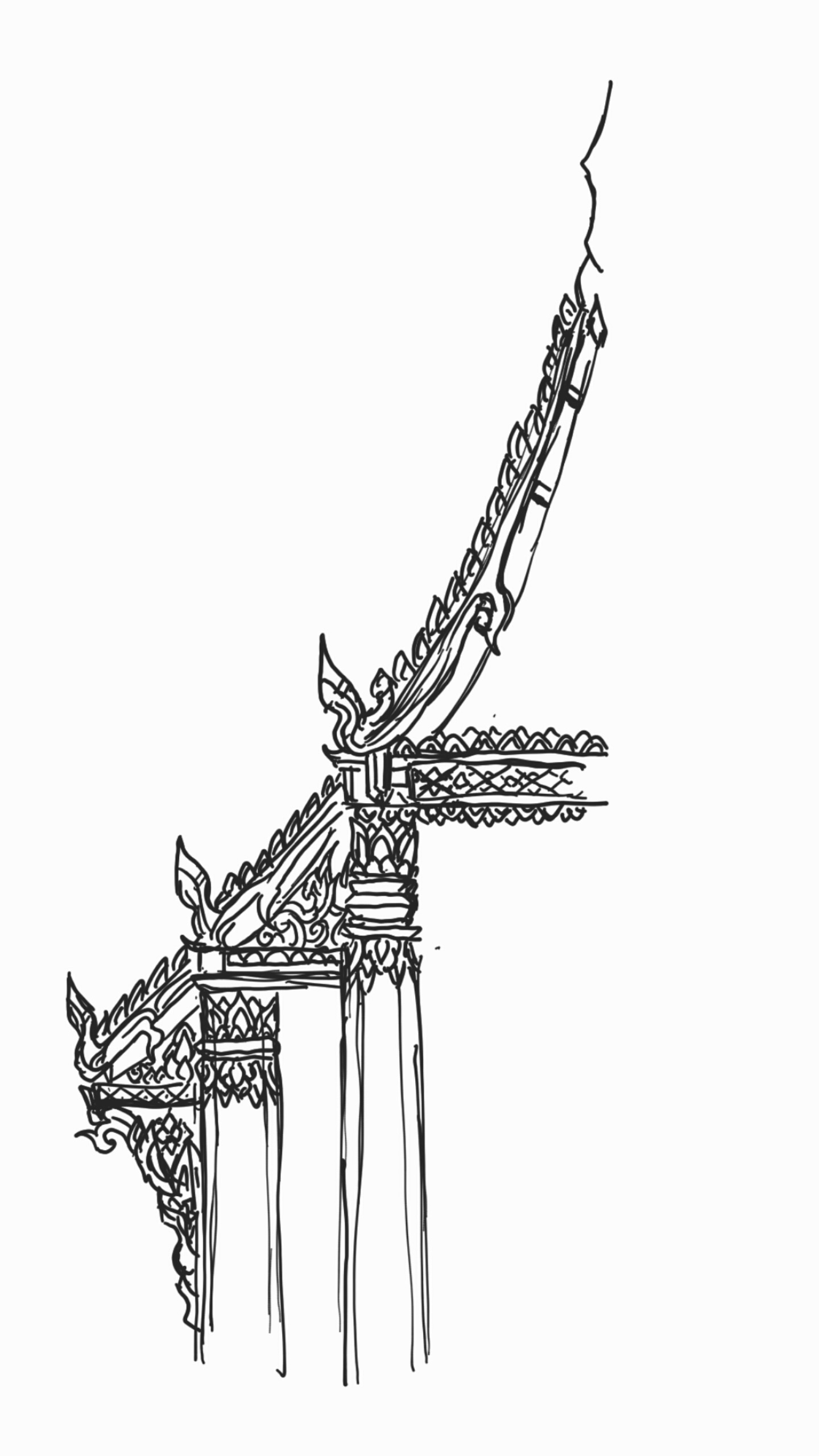
Basic Lamyong decorative structure of roof

=== Roof forms ===
Temples display multiple roof tiers. The use of ornamented tiers is reserved for roofs on temples, palaces and important public buildings. Two or three tiers are most often used, but some royal temples have four. The practice is more aesthetic than functional. Temple halls and their roofs are large. To lighten the roof's appearance, the lowest tier is the largest with a smaller middle layer and the smallest tier on top. Multiple breaks in each roof lighten it further – a double-tiered roof might have 2–4 breaks in each tier. The tiers, breaks and tier patterns create dynamic visual rhythms. In northern temples, the roof area is larger, sweeping low to cover more of the wall. The lower tiers telescope toward the entrance. In a central Thai temple, the lower tiers reach a short distance beyond the top roof at the gable ends.

=== Roof finials ===
Most decorations are attached to the bargeboard, the long, thin panel on the edge of the roof at the gable ends. The decorative structure is called the lamyong. The lamyong is sculpted in an undulating, serpentine nag sadung shape evoking the Nāga. Its blade-like projection called bai raka suggest both Nāga fins and the feathers of Garuda. Its lower finial is called a hang hong, which usually takes the form of a Nāga's head turned up and facing away from the roof. The Nāga head may be styled in flame-like kranok motifs and may have multiple heads. A roof with multiple breaks or tiers has identical hang hong finials at the bottom of each section. Perched on the peak of the lamyong is the large curving ornament called a Chofah, which resembles the beak of a bird, perhaps representing Garuda.

=== Curved base and roofline ===
Yon Thong Samphao (หย่อนท้องสำเภา, lit. "sagging ship hull") or Tok Thong Chang (ตกท้องช้าง, lit. "sagging elephant's belly") is a distinctive architectural feature in Thai architecture, particularly prevalent during the late Ayutthaya Kingdom. It is characterized by a deliberate concave curvature of the building's base (foundation) and the roofline, mimicking the elegant profile of a Chinese junk hull.

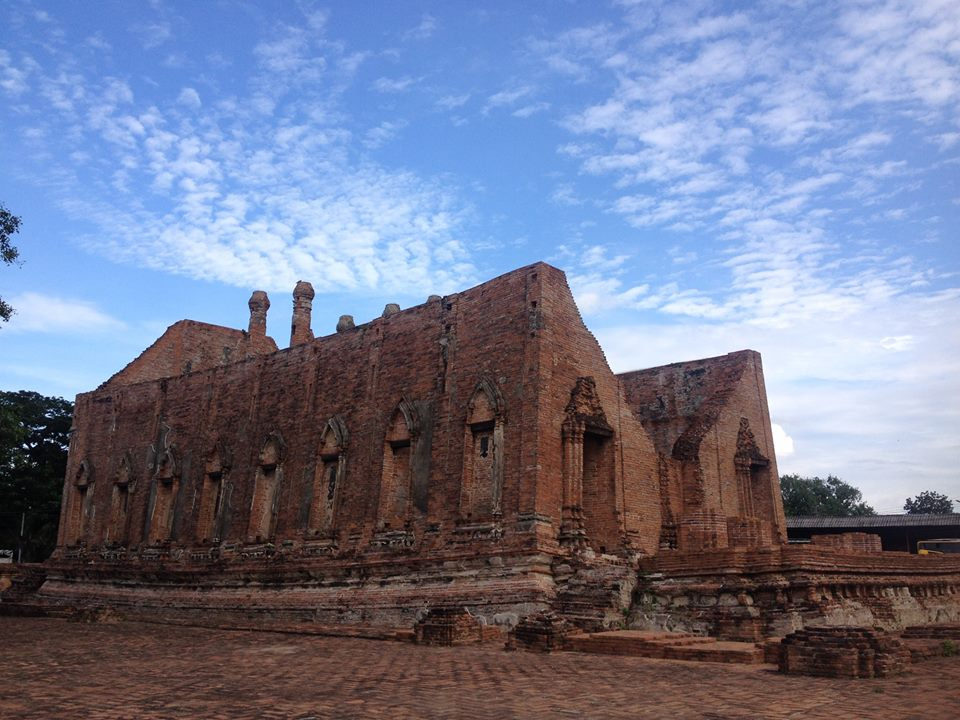
The ruins of the ubosot at Wat Kudi Dao, Ayutthaya, displaying a distinct concave base.

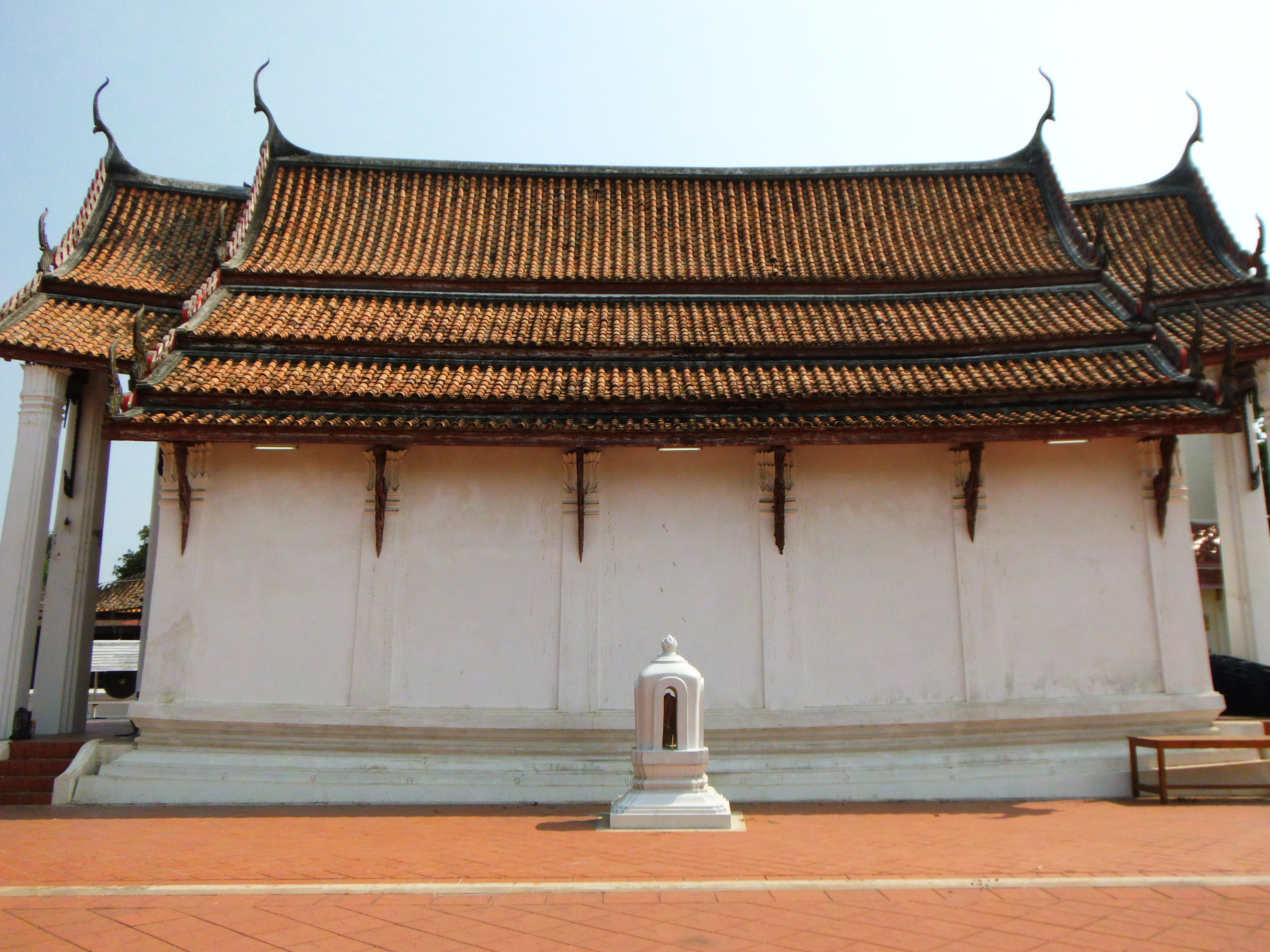
Wat Prasat in Nonthaburi, one of the best-preserved examples of the sagging ship hull profile.

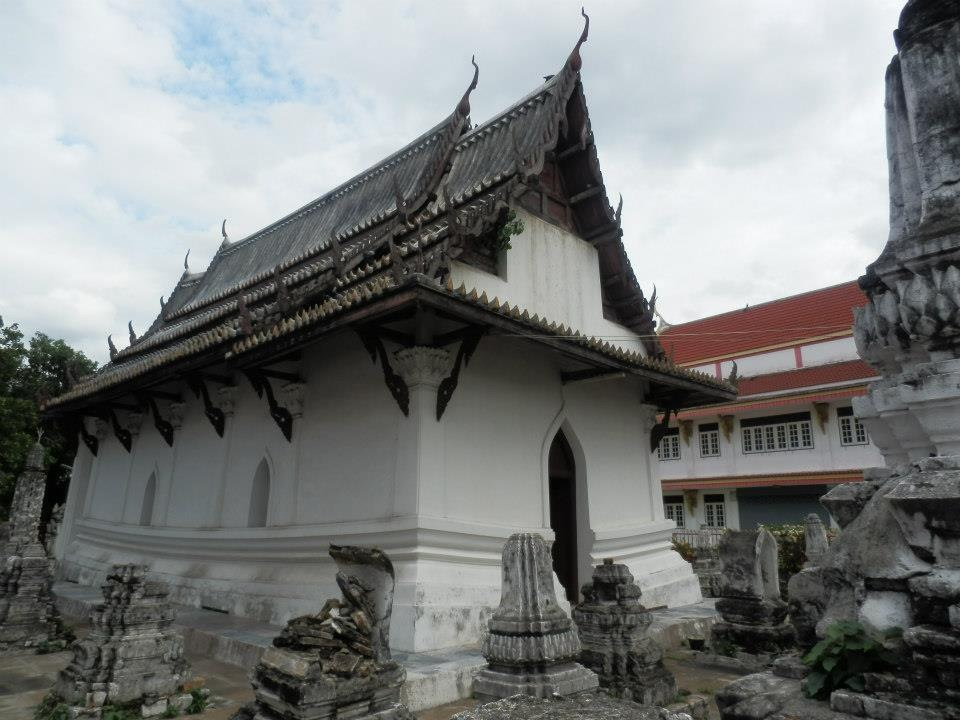
The ubosot at Wat Chong Nonsi in Bangkok

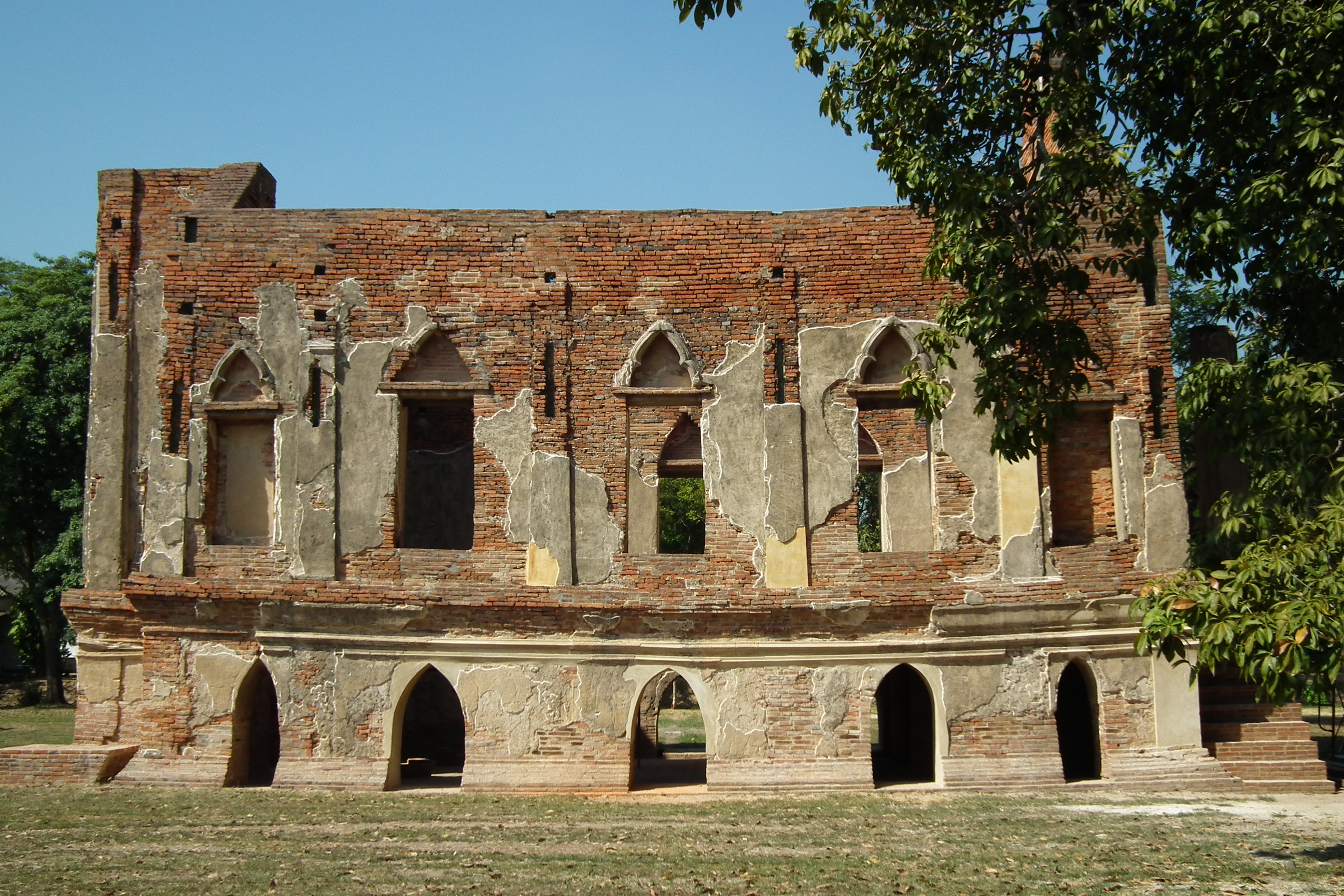
Ruins of Kham Yat Palace in Ang Thong

== Popular temple icons ==
Thai Theravada Buddhism and Hindu cultures merged, and Hindu elements were introduced into Thai iconography. Popular figures include the four-armed figure of Vishnu; the garuda (half man, half bird); the eight-armed Shiva; elephant-headed Ganesh; the Nāga, which appears as a snake, dragon or cobra; and the ghost-banishing giant Yaksha.

== See also ==
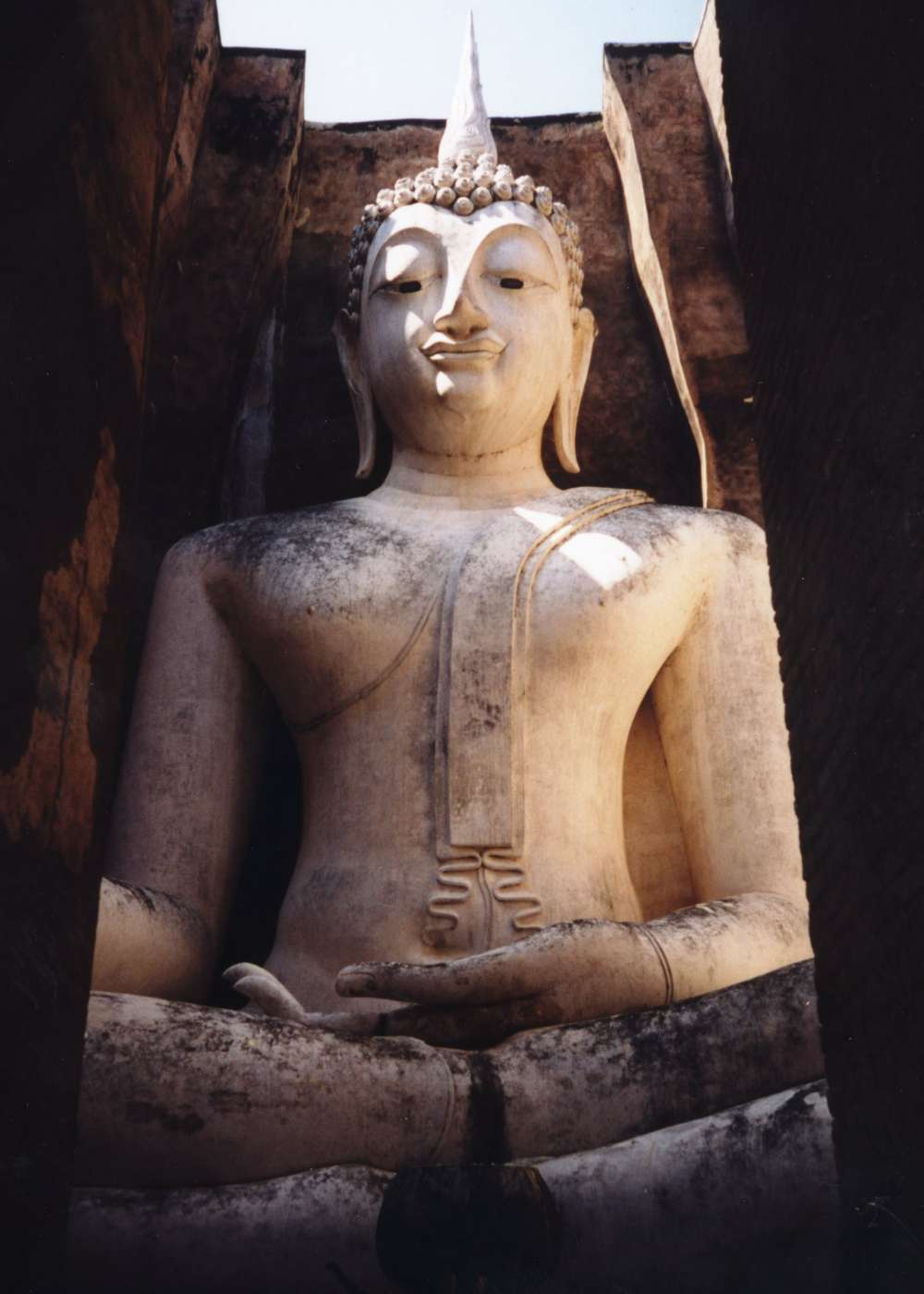
Phra Achana Buddha, Wat Si Chum, Sukhothai Historical Park

=== Depictions of the Buddha ===
- Development of the Buddha image in Thailand
- Iconography of Gautama Buddha in Laos and Thailand
- Characteristics of a Thai Buddha

=== Statues and ornamentation: deities, demons and mythical beings ===
- Apsara
- Erawan
- Ganesh
- Garuda
- Guanyin
- Hanuman
- Indra
- Kinnara
- Kirtimukha
- Makara
- Nāga
- Phra Phrom
- Rama
- Ravana
- Shiva
- Vishnu
- Yaksha

=== Architectural elements ===
- Bai Sema
- Chofa

=== General ===
- Architecture of Thailand
- Buddhism in Thailand
- List of Buddhist temples in Thailand
- Thai art
- Vessantara Jātaka
- Ramakien
- Sumeru
- Himavanta

== Sources ==
- Discovery Channel by Scott Rutherford, "Insight Guides: Thailand.", APA Publications GmbH & Co., 2004.
- Discovery Channel by Steve Van Beek, "Insight Pocket Guide: Thailand.", APA Publications GmbH & Co., 2004.
- Maria Grazia Casella and Paola Piacco, "Thailand: Nature and Wonders.", Asia Books Co,.Ltd., 2004.
- John Hoskin and Gerald Cubitt, "This is Thailand.", Asia Books Co., Ltd., 2003
