= Sala kan parian =

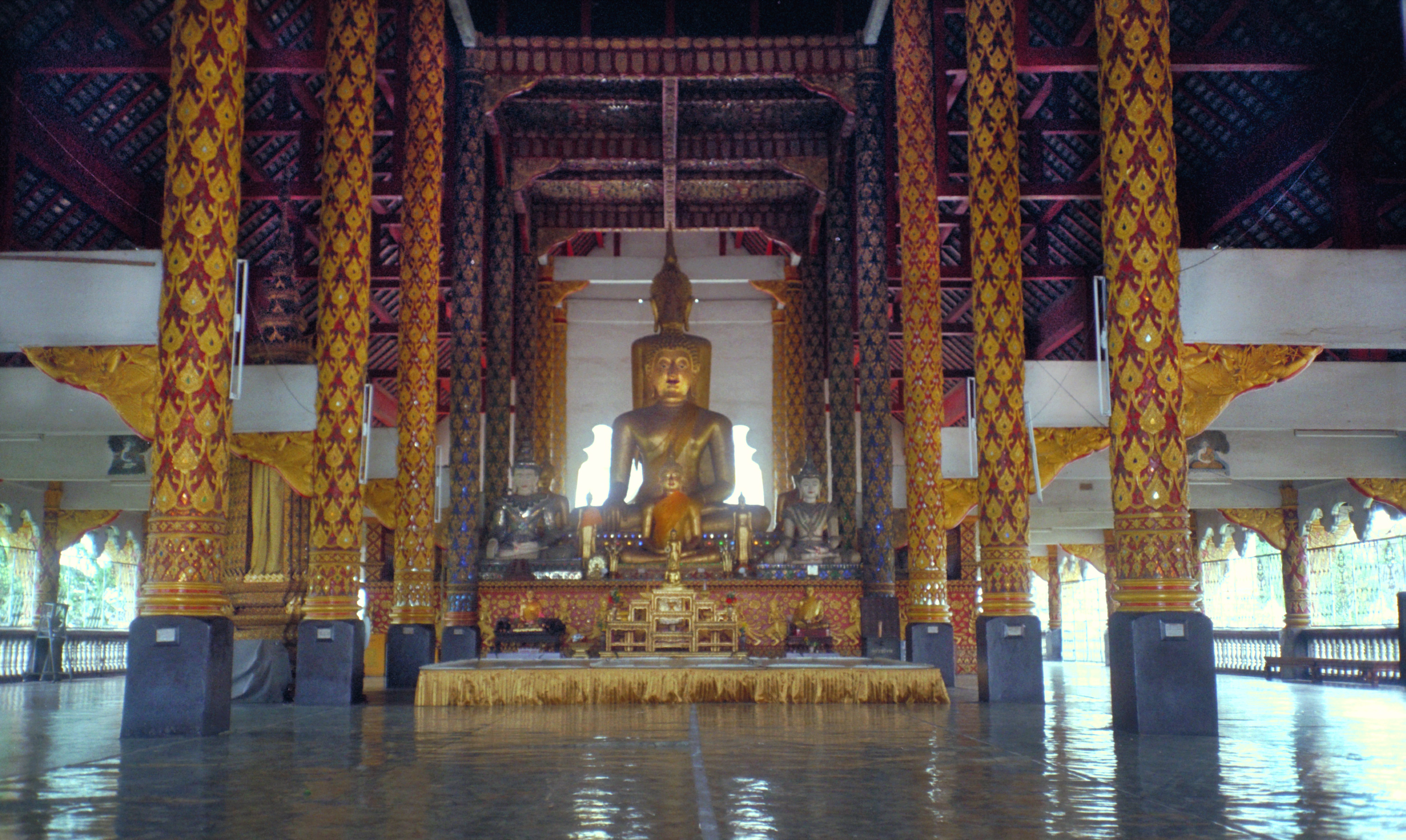
The sala kan prian of Wat Suan Dok in Chiang Mai

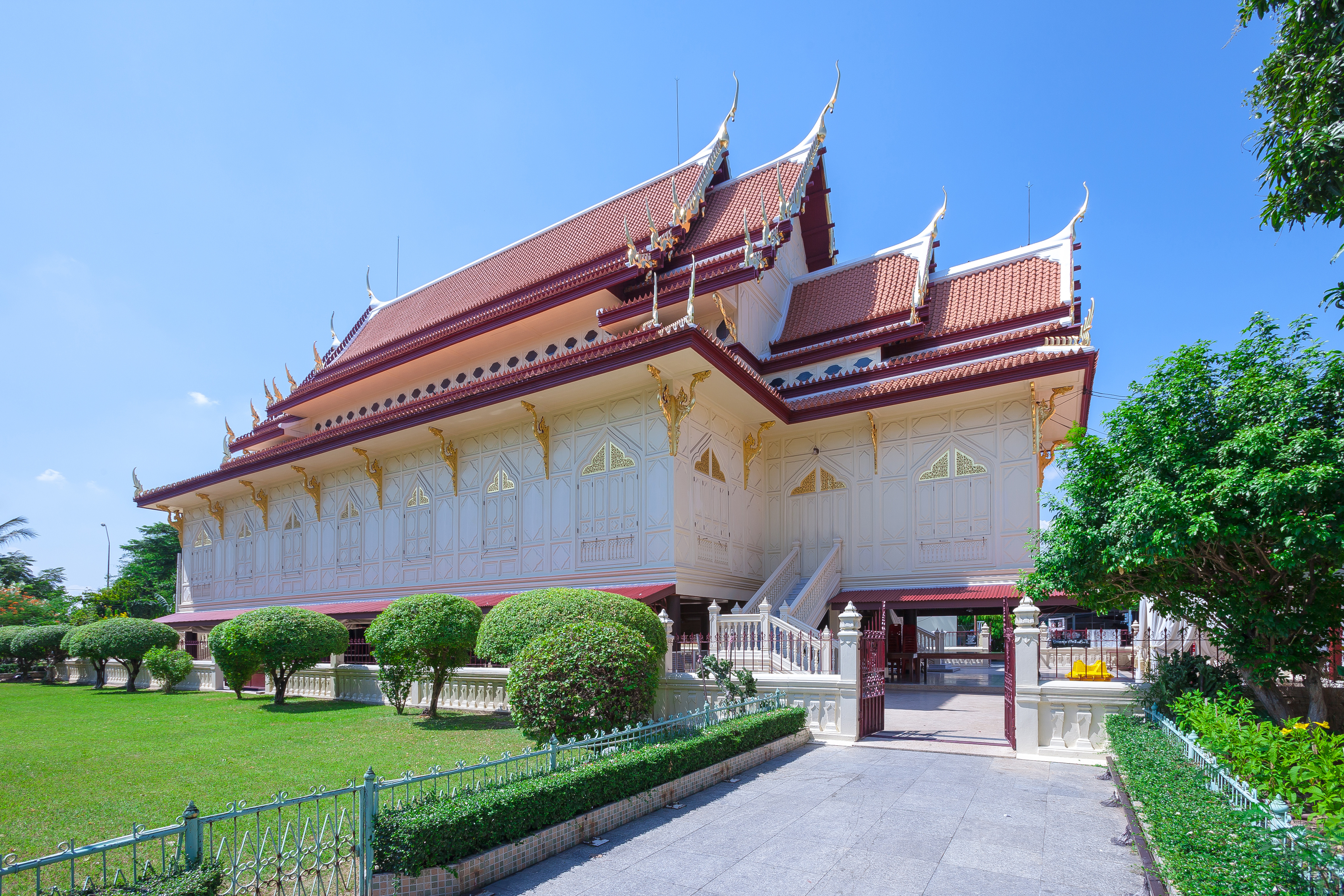
Sermon hall of Wat Rachathiwat, Bangkok

Sala kan parian (Thai: ศาลาการเปรียญ) is the highest form of a Thai temple sala (pavilion). This pavilion is traditionally built as a hall in which clerics can instruct lay people in Buddhist doctrine, and is sometimes also used as a place for monks to chant and perform ceremonies. A sala kan parian may be as large as an assembly hall, or even larger, and partly or fully enclosed by walls.
