= Chofa =

Lao and Thai architectural decorative ornament

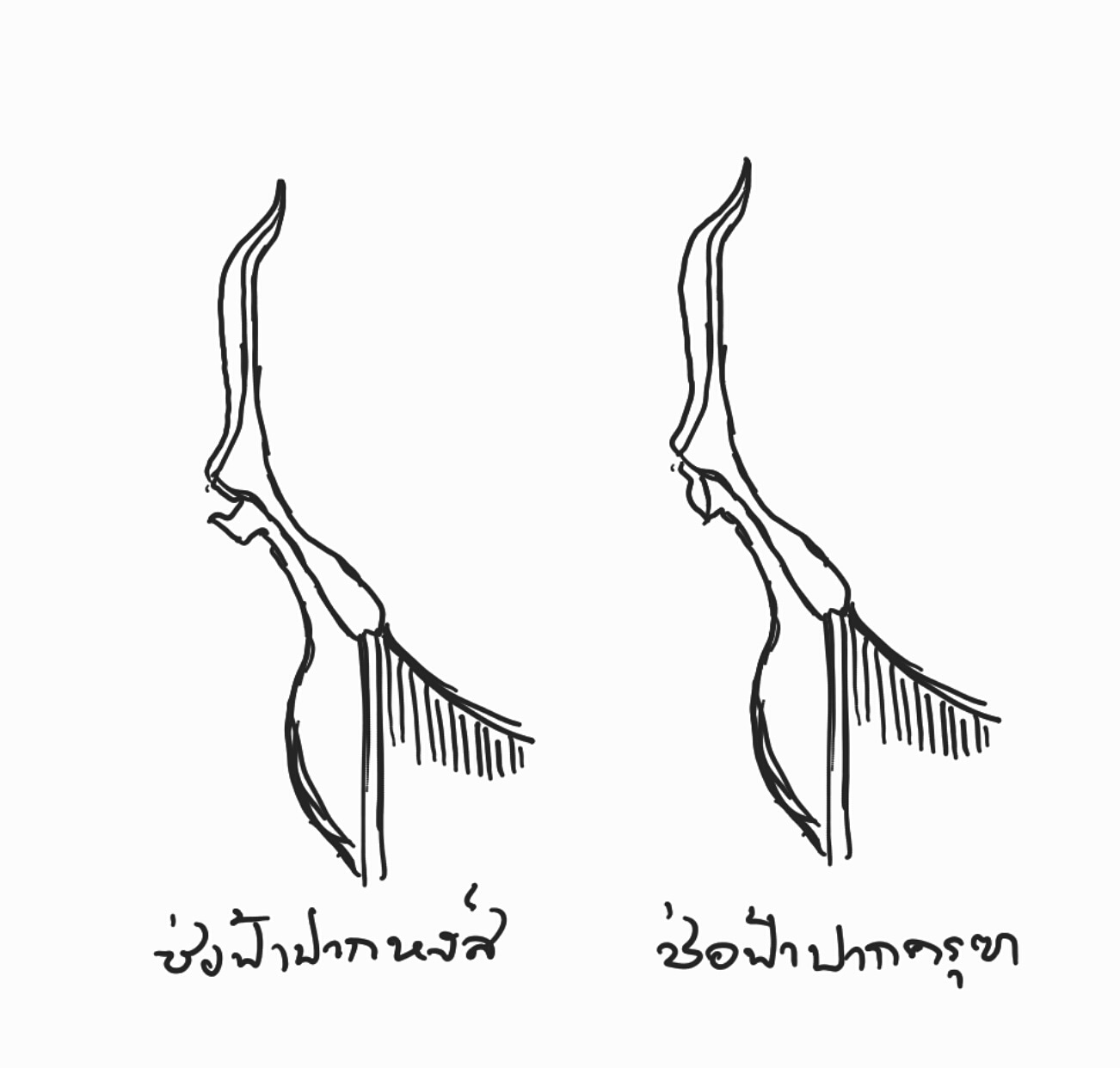
Two main types of Chofa: Pak Hong; Swan's tip (left) and Pak Khrut; Garuda's tip (right)

Chofa (Thai: ช่อฟ้า, pronounced [t͡ɕʰɔ̂ːfáː]; lit. sky tassel) is a Lao and Thai architectural decorative ornament that adorns the top at the end of wat and palace roofs in most Southeast Asian countries, such as Thailand, Cambodia, Laos, and Myanmar. It resembles a tall thin bird and looks hornlike. The chofa is generally believed to represent the mythical creature Garuda, half bird and half man, who is the vehicle of the Hindu god Vishnu.

== History ==
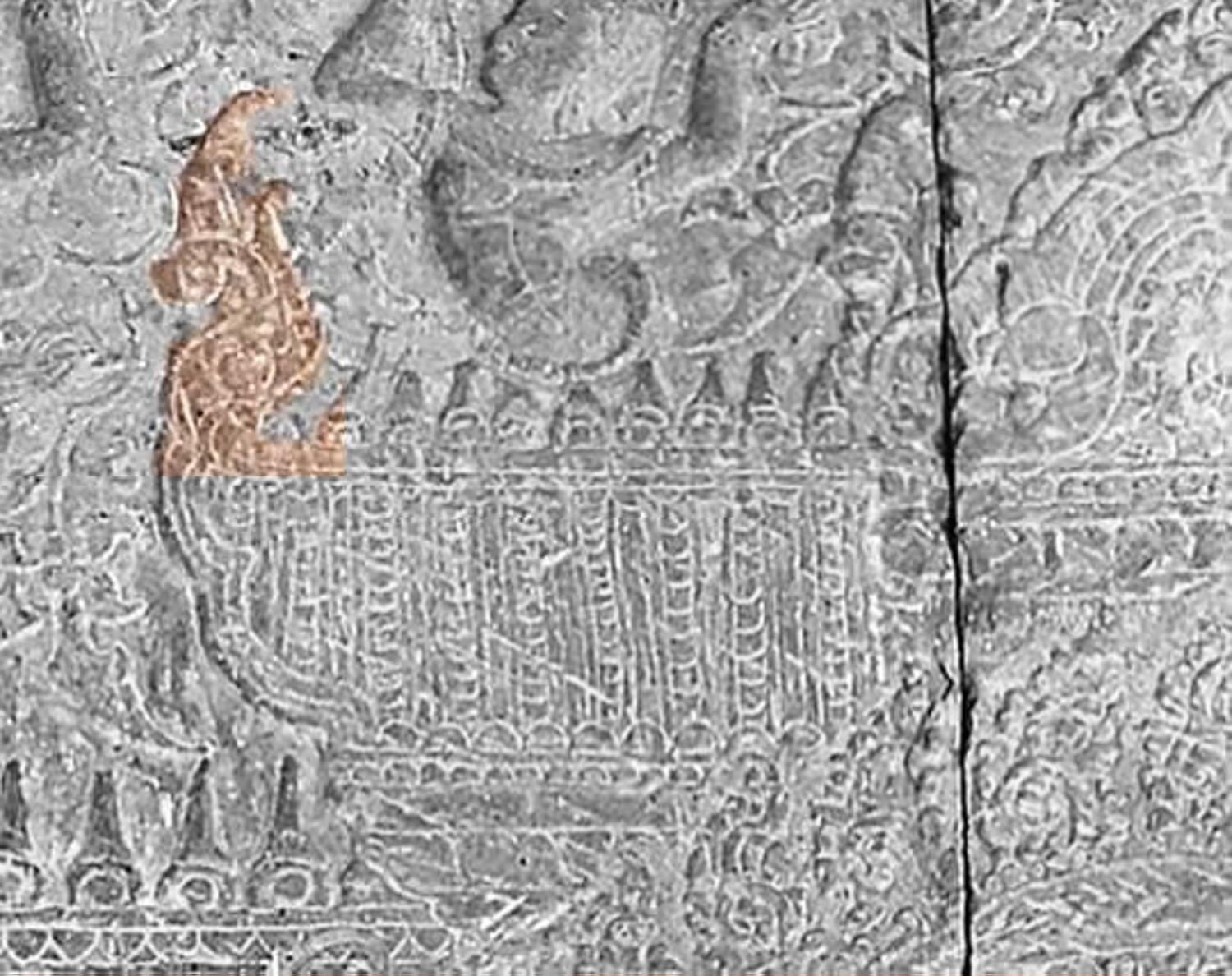
Roof finial or chofah (colorized) as depicted on the bas relief of Angkor Wat temple in 12th century.

the present research indicates that the original chofah upon which most subsequent chofah have been based is the gajashimha of Suryavarman II,

Temple finials representing gajashimha was presumably appeared in Cambodia during or shortly after his reign (1113 AD to 1150 AD). These finials (chofah) symbolized the unification of the northern and southern Khmer kingdoms and the reign of King Suryavarman II. This symbolism spread extensively throughout the region including part of today Laos, Lanna, and Isan

From 13th to 18th century, ceramic finials or chofah in the form of the gajashimha were largely produced in Sukothai, Sawankalok, and Ayutthaya.

Today most wats or pagodas and palaces throughout Cambodia, Laos, and Thailand are adorned with these sacred finials at their roof end with many types and appearance.

== Raising of chofa ==
The ceremony of chofa raising (Thai: พิธียกช่อฟ้า; RTGS: phithi yok chofa) marks the completion of the structure that the chofa tops. The ceremony revolves around the consecration of the chofa and the structure, mostly ubosot or wihan, and ends with the topping off the roof with the chofa. Such ceremonies are considered a great merit in Thai Buddhism.

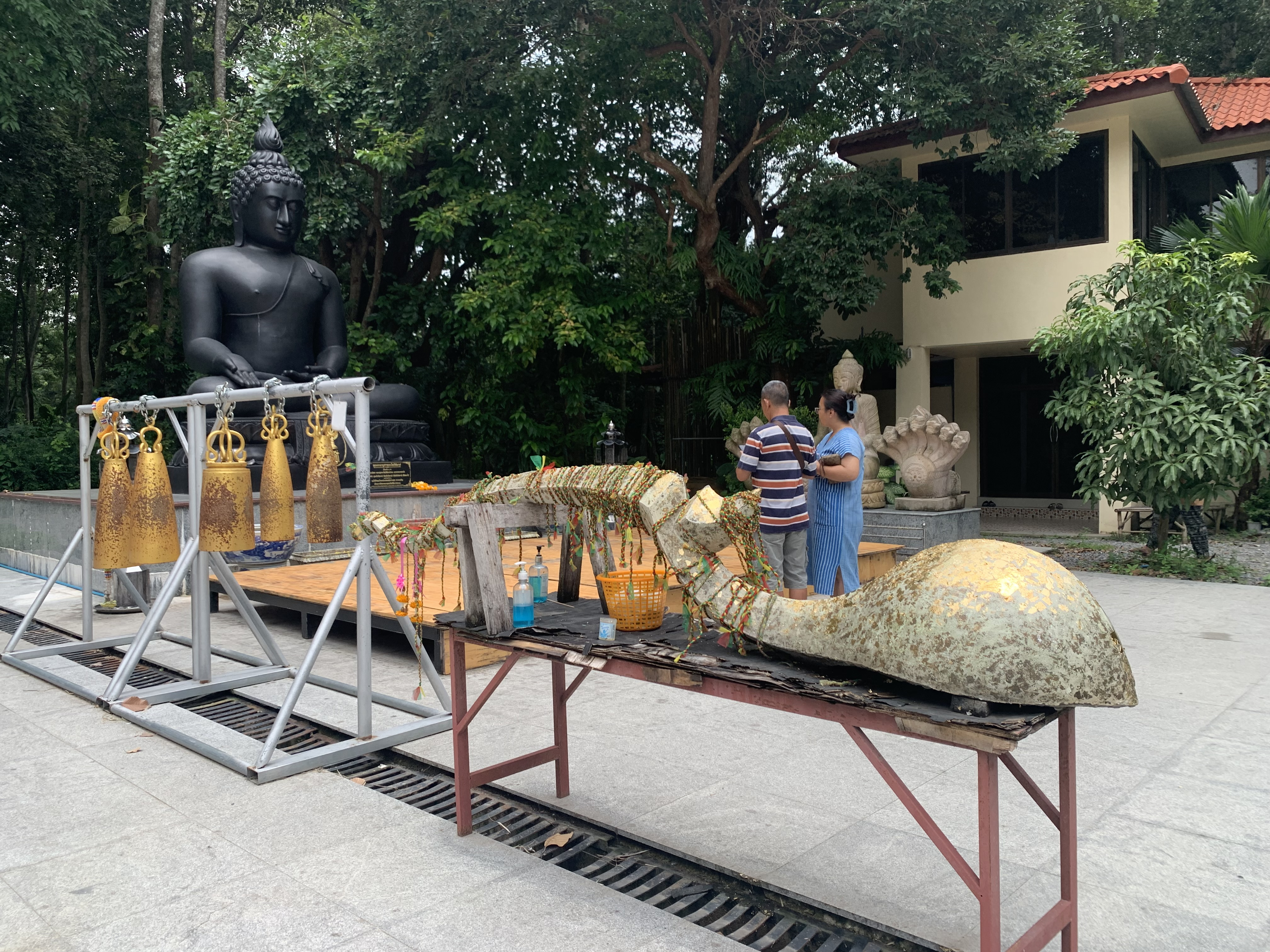
A chofa laid down for temple-goers to participate in individually gold-plating prior to its raising ceremony to top the ubosot of Wat Chulabhorn Wanaram, Ban Na District

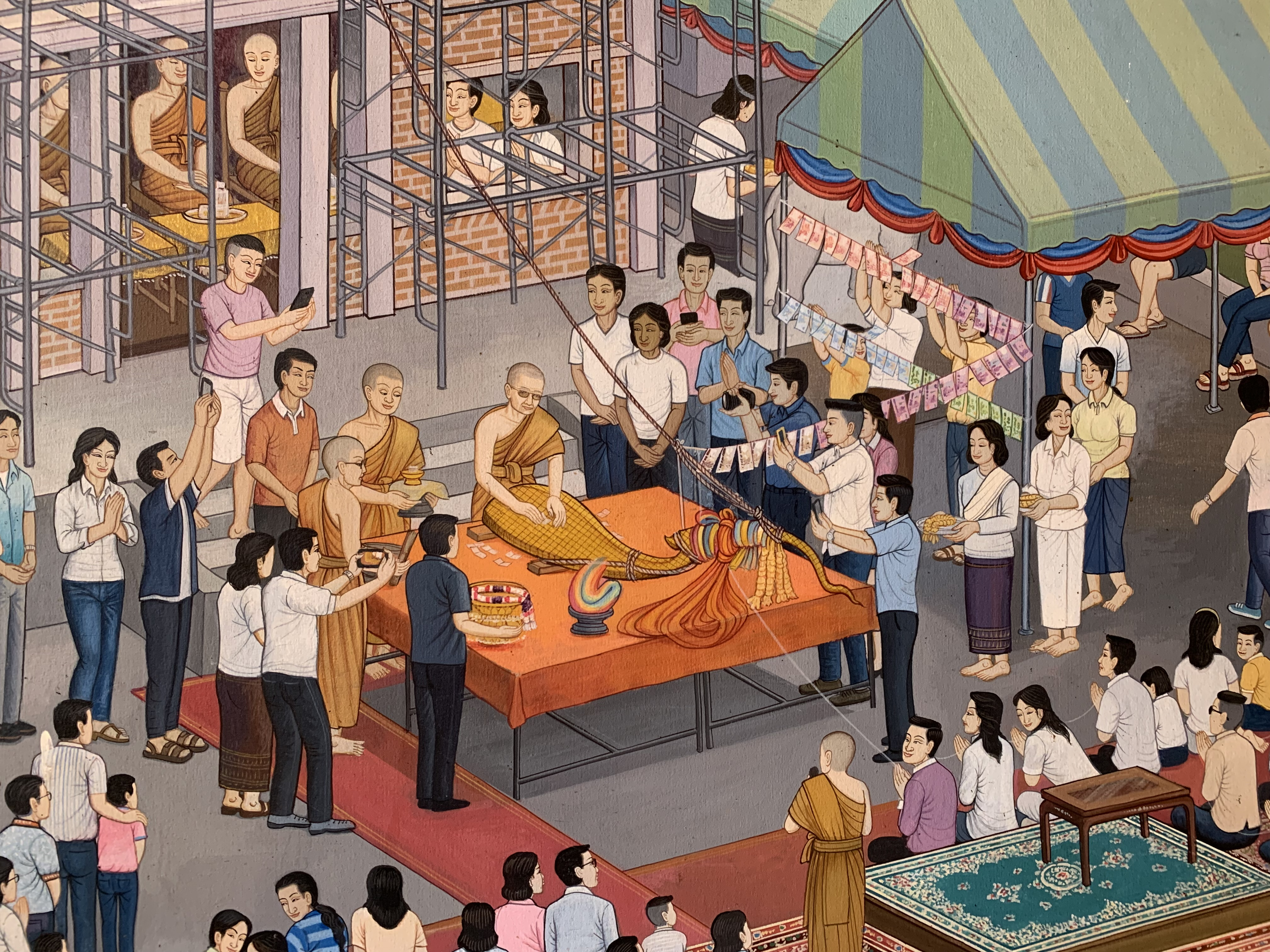
A mural depicting the ceremony of chofa raising of the new ubosot of Wat Tha Phra, Bangkok

== Components ==
- Horn
- Tip
- Breast

== Types ==
- Swan tip (Pak Hong; ปากหงส์)
- Garuda tip (Pak Khrut; ปากครุฑ)
- Fish tip (Pak Pla; ปากปลา)
- Elephant head (Hua Chang; หัวช้าง)
- Naga head
- Bird head (Hua Nok; หัวนก)
- Lanna (ล้านนา)
- Others
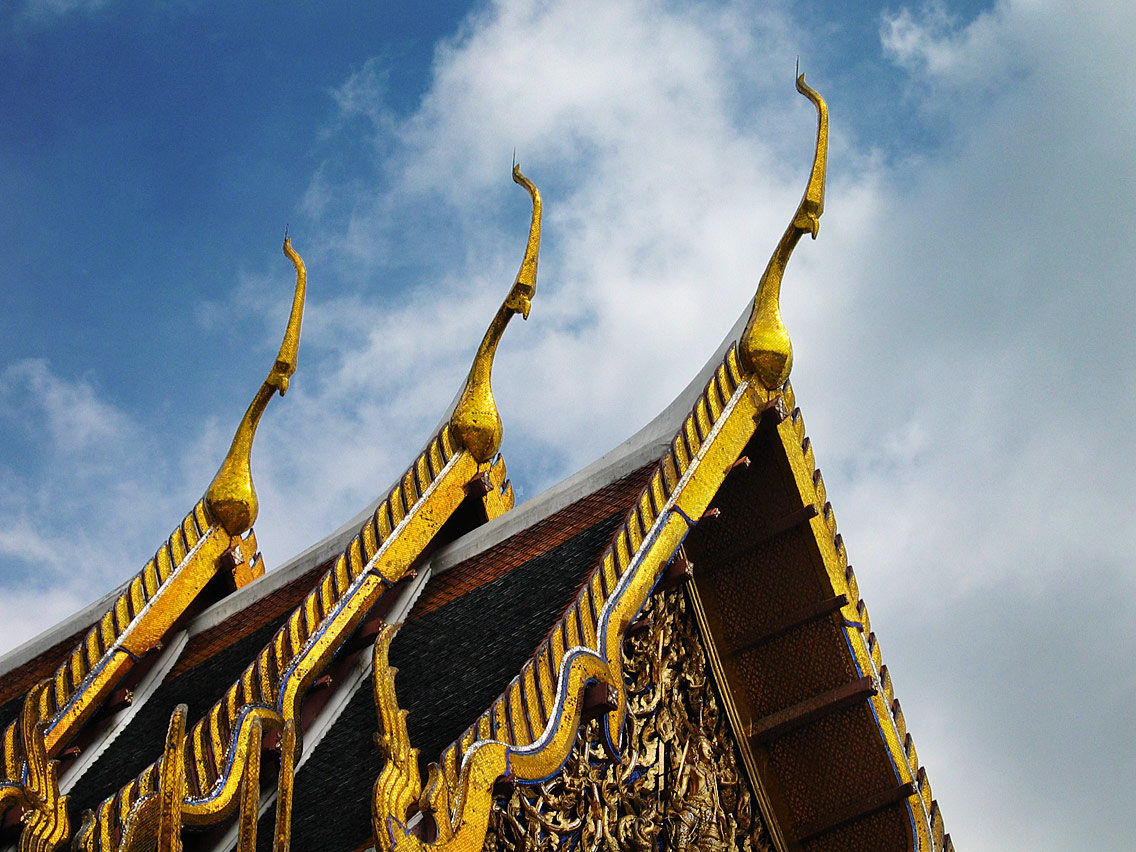
Chofa of Ubosot, Wat Phra Kaeo, Bangkok (Garuda tip Chofa)

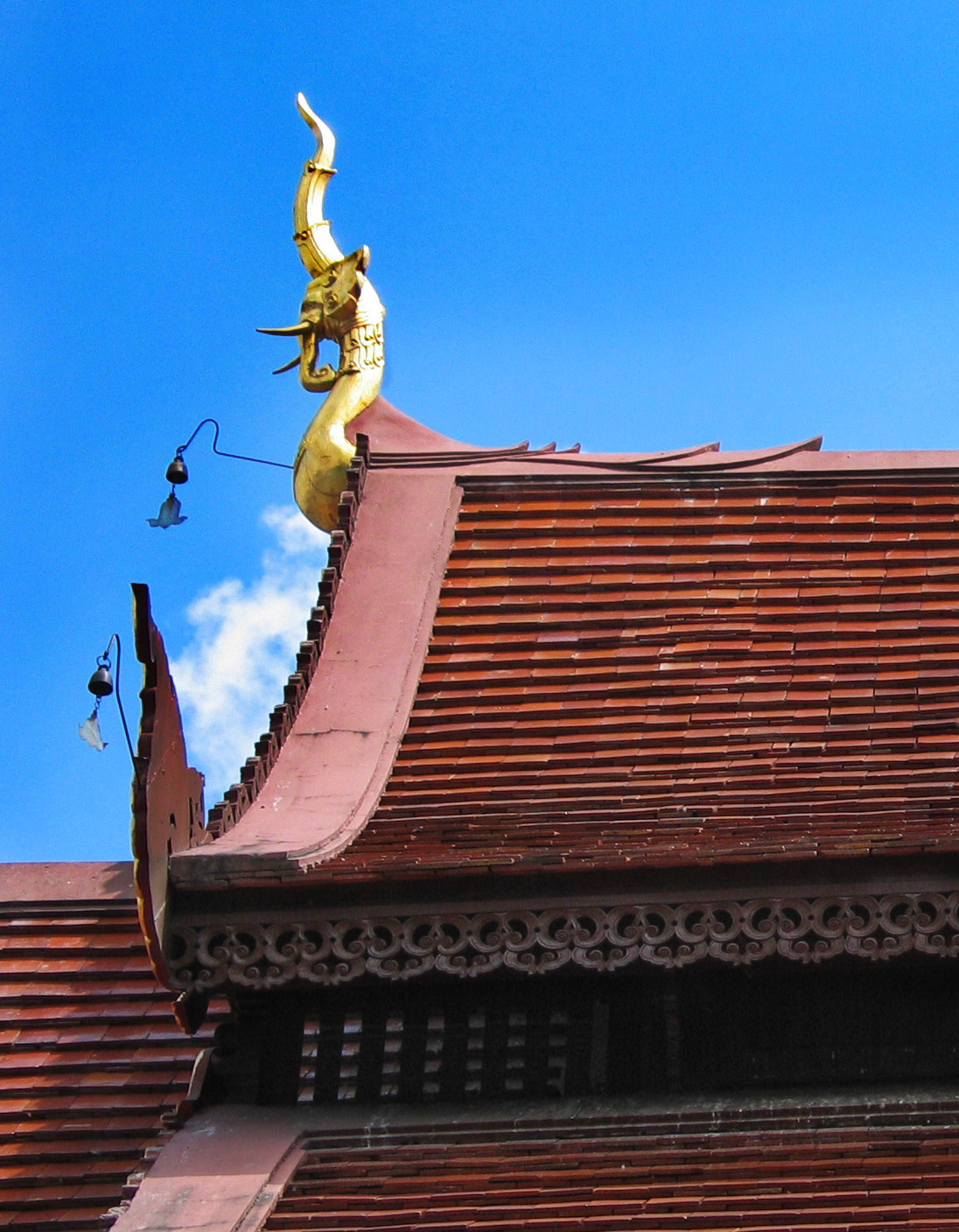
Chofa of Viharn, Wat Ched Yot, Chiang Mai (Elephant head Chofa)

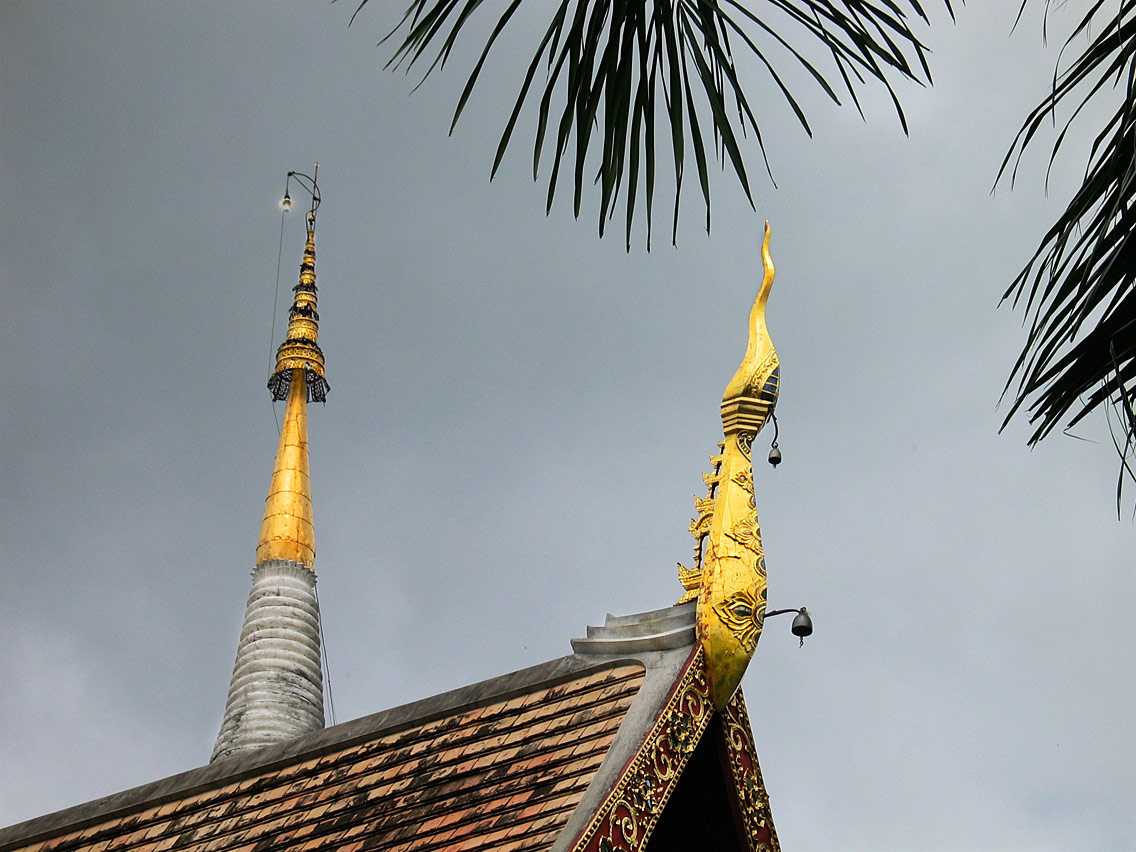
Chofa of Ubosot, Wat Phra Singh, Chiang Mai (Lanna art Chofa)

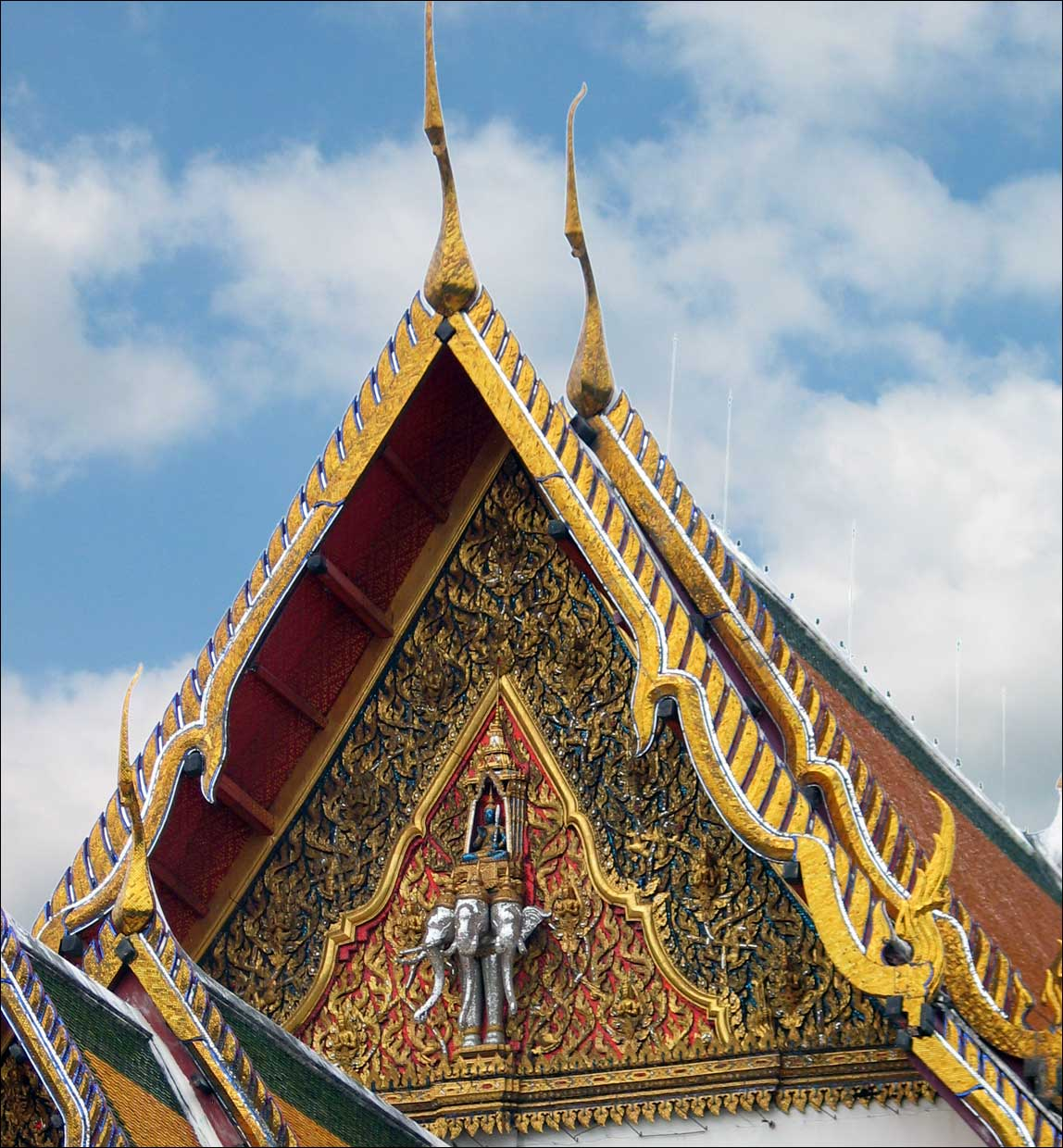
Chofa of Viharn Luang, Wat Suthat, Bangkok (Fish tip Chofa)

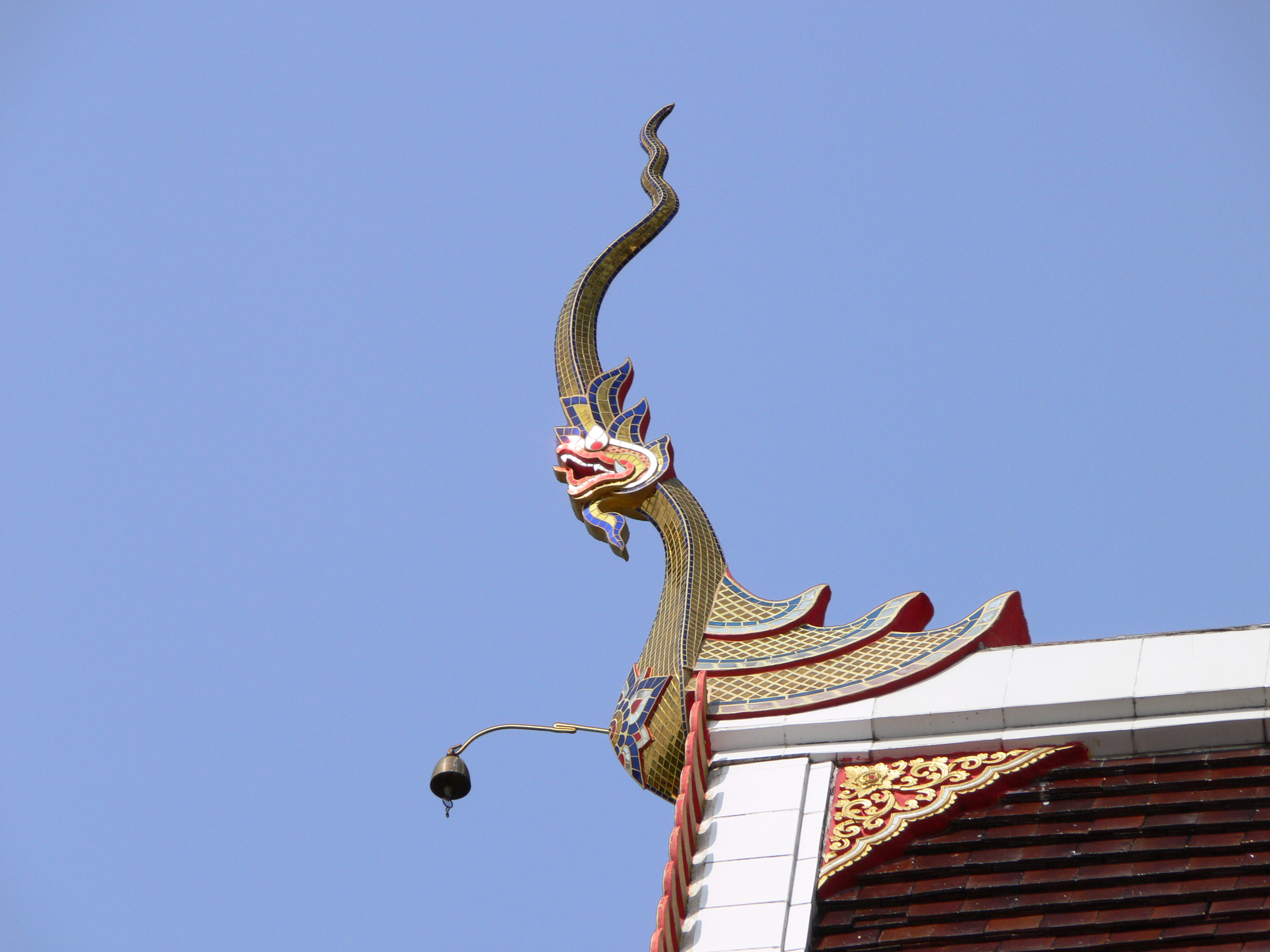
Chofa of Wat Monthian, Chiang Mai (Naga head Chofa)
