= List of Buddhist temples in Indonesia =

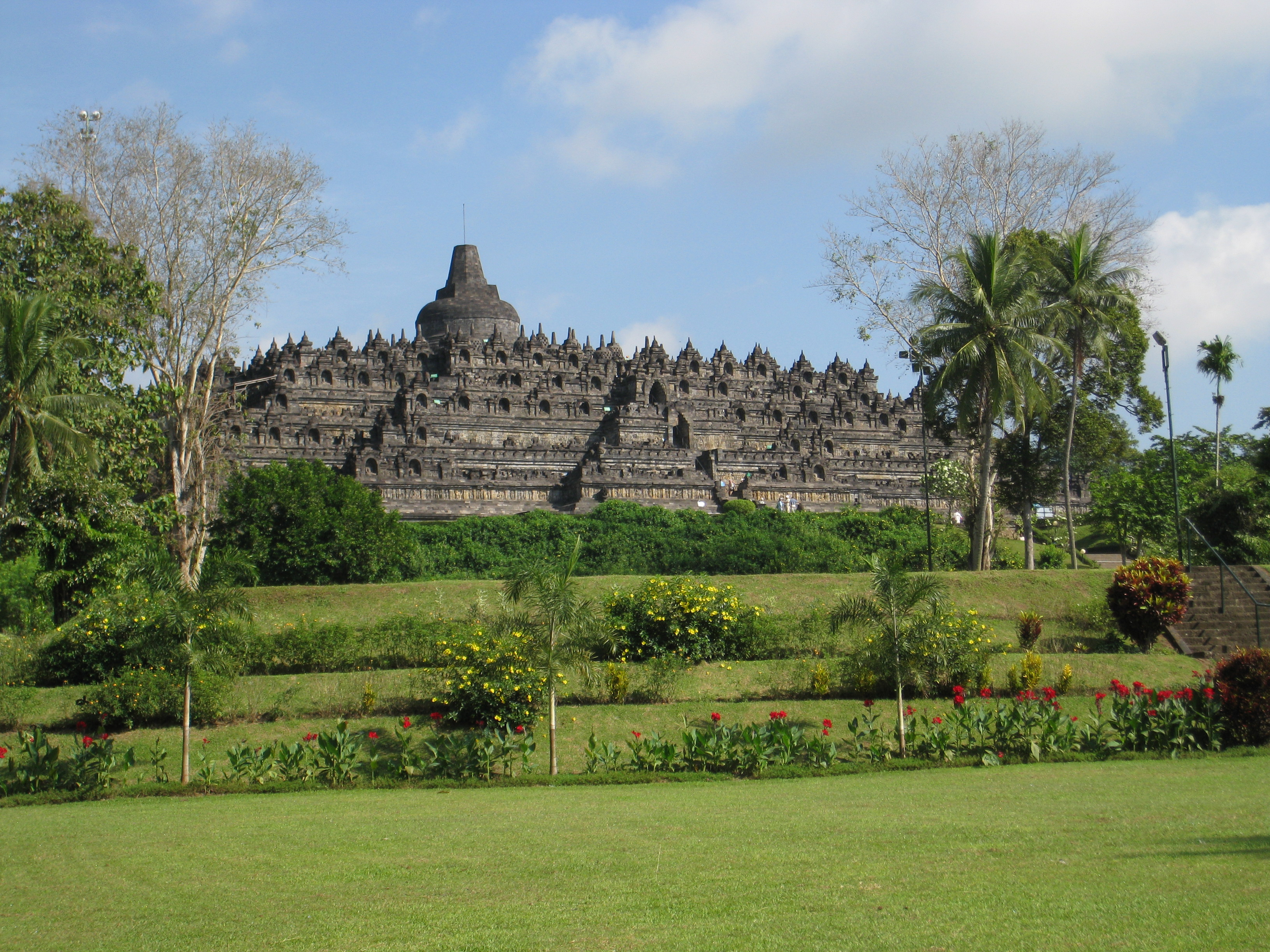
Borobudur, a UNESCO World Heritage Site

This is a list of Buddhist temples, monasteries, stupas, and pagodas in Indonesia for which there are Wikipedia articles, sorted by location.

== Bali ==
- Vihara Buddha Banjar

== Java ==
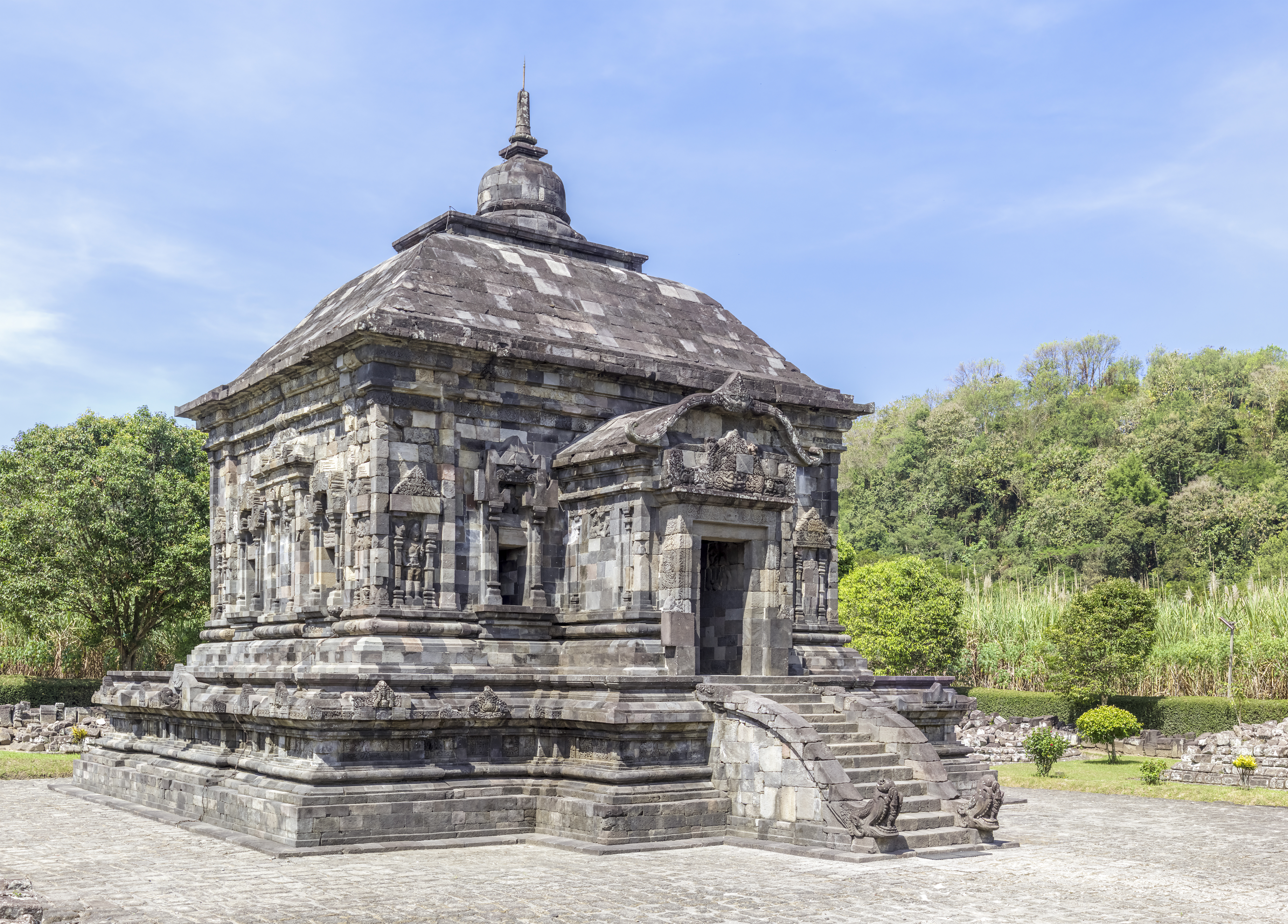
Candi Banyunibo located in a paddy field southeast of Ratu Boko

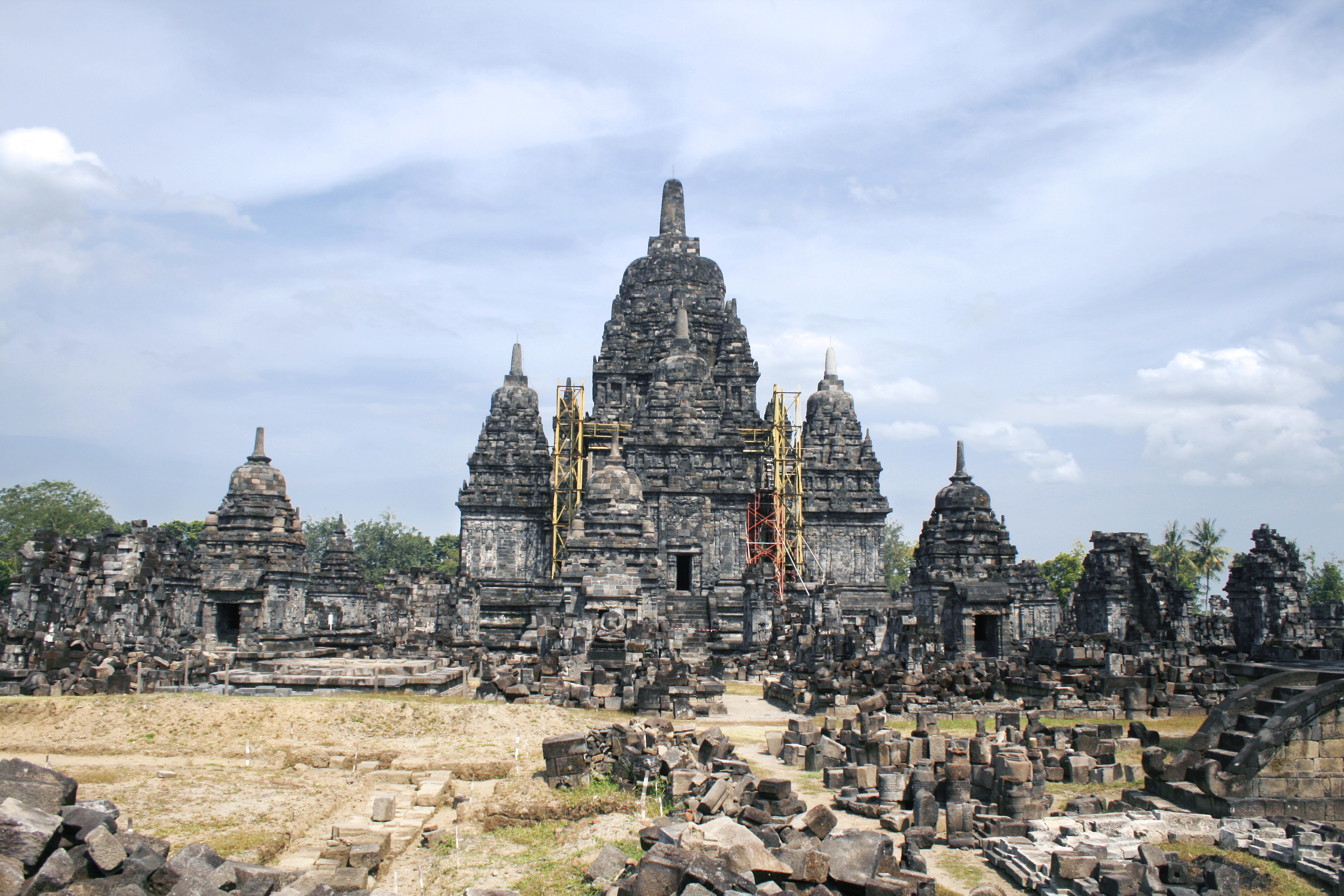
Sewu

=== East Java ===
- Candi Jabung
- Candi Surawana

=== Central Java ===
- Candi Banyunibo
- Candi Borobudur
- Candi Kalasan
- Candi Mendut
- Candi Pawon
- Candi Plaosan
- Candi Sari
- Candi Sewu
- Vihara Buddhagaya Watugong

=== West Java ===
- Candi Batujaya

== Sumatra ==
- Candi Bahal
- Candi Muara Takus
- Candi Muaro Jambi
- Lumbini Natural Park
- Maha Vihara Maitreya

== See also ==
- Buddhism in Indonesia
- Candi of Indonesia
- Ashin Jinarakkhita
- Parwati Soepangat
- Indonesian Esoteric Buddhism
- List of Buddhist temples
