= Guanghua Temple (Putian) =

Buddhist temple in Fujian, China

- 广化寺
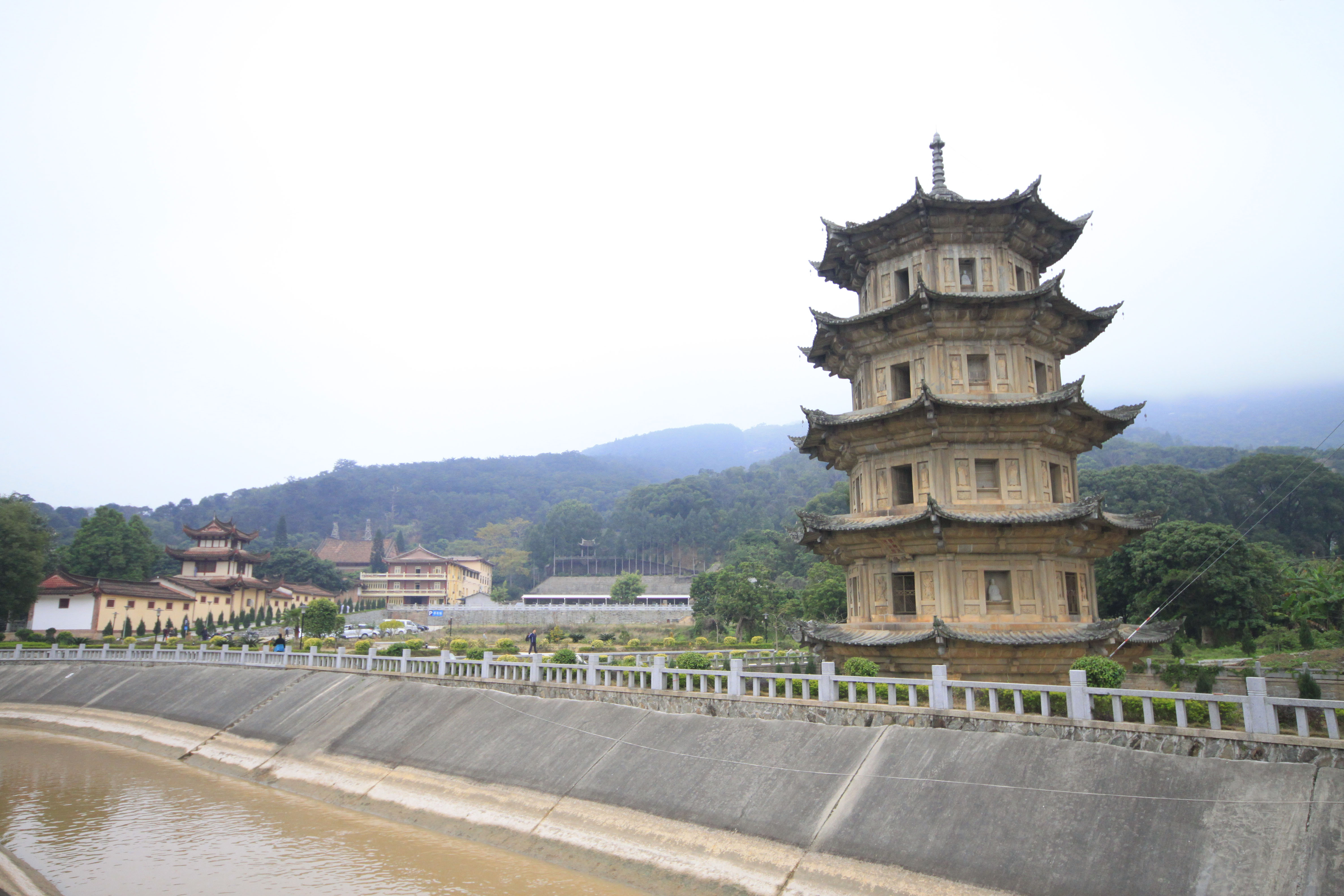
- Shijiawen (Sakyamuni) Pagoda, Guanghua Temple

- Location within Fujian

Religion
- Affiliation: Buddhism
- Sect: Chan Buddhism

Location
- Location: Putian, Fujian, China
- Coordinates: 25°25′42″N 118°59′05″E

Architecture
- Style: Chinese architecture
- Established: 558

The Guanghua Temple (simplified Chinese: 广化寺; traditional Chinese: 廣化寺; pinyin: Guǎnghuā Sì), also known as the South Mountain Guanghua Temple (南山广寺), is a Buddhist temple located at the foot of Mount Phoenix (凤凰山), about 2 kilometres (1.2 mi) south of Putian City, Fujian Province, People's Republic of China.

Built in the penultimate year of the Southern Chen dynasty (588 CE), it is one of the most influential Chinese Buddhism temples in China as well as one of the most scenic visitor attractions in Fujian Province.

== Location ==
The temple stands about 500 metres (1,600 ft) from the entrance to the Longmen Stone Cave (龙门石洞) and is spread over an area of more than 32,000 m (105,000 ft).

== History and development ==
=== Ancient times ===
Constructed in 558 CE, the second year of Emperor Wu of Chen's Yongding (永定) era, the temple was originally called the Jinxian Monastery (金仙庵), after its first abbot, Master Jinxian. In 589 CE, founding Sui dynasty Emperor Wen, a Buddhist adherent, extended the building and renamed it the "Guanghua Temple".

During Emperor Xuanzong of Tang's reign (685–762 CE), Indian monks came to discuss and lecture on Buddhism at the temple. Xuanzong also built a tower in the grounds. The temple changed its name again during the Tang dynasty when in 771 CE, the second year of his Jingyun (景云) era, Emperor Ruizong of Tang dubbed it the Lingyan Temple (灵岩寺) and had a signboard created by the renowned calligrapher Liu Gongquan.

Finally, during the early reign of Emperor Taizong of Song (r. 976–997 CE), the temple once more became the Guanghua Temple.

The establishment flourished during the Song (1279–1368) and Ming (1368–1644) Dynasties. Along with Fuzhou's Gushan Spring Temple (鼓山涌泉寺), Quanzhou's Kaiyuan Temple (开元寺), and Xiamen's Nanputuo Temple, the Guanghua Temple was known as one of the four great Buddhist monasteries or Conglin (丛林) of Fujian Province.

In 1341 CE the Guanghua Monastery was destroyed during a war then rebuilt between 1368 and 1424 CE only to be once more razed to the ground by fire in 1562. In the second half of the sixteenth century the monastery underwent alterations and reconstruction.

Qing Kangxi Emperor carried out a comprehensive building program at the temple during 1692 and merged it with the nearby Fahai Temple (法海寺).

=== Modern era ===
By 1886 only the Guanyin Hall, with two resident monks, remained of the monastery.

In 1890 Shanhe became president of the Guanghua Monastery and began a rebuilding program. The Jeweled Hall of the Great Heroes, Parlour, the Mediation Hall, the Abbot's Room and the Brahma-carya Hall were all rebuilt to form the present-day complex. Master Benru built the additional Sutra Pavilion as an extension to the Dharma Hall, after Emperor Xuantong's 1910 donation of more than 7,000 rolls of Dragon Sutra. In 1933, the Guanyin Hall and the Tianwang Hall were also rebuilt.

Until 1949 monasteries were built in other Southeast Asian countries by monks of the Guanghua Monastery to spread Chinese Buddhism. Presently, the Guanghua Monastery has seven branches in the Malay Peninsula and Indonesia. (Note: This was in the time of the so-called Buddhist Revival, when, under influence of the western culture, attempts were made to revitalize Chinese Buddhism. Most notable were the Humanistic Buddhism of Taixu, and the revival of Chinese Chán by Hsu Yun.)

At the foundation of the People's Republic of China in 1949 the temple had a resident population of 60 monks, a figure which by 1965 had declined to 57. Used as a factory for a period during the turmoil of the Cultural Revolution (1966–1976), the monks were dispelled and all statues of deities smashed.

With reform and opening up during the late 1970s and the advent of religious freedom, Master Yuanchan (圆禅法师) from the Yechengguang Garden Temple (椰城广化寺) in Indonesia together with other overseas Chinese began to support the Guanghua Temple. In 1979, a six-year restoration program began under the supervision of then 70-year-old Venerable Master Yuanzhou (圆拙老法师).

In 1983 the temple became one of the Chinese Buddhism Regional Temples (汉族地区全国重点寺院) whilst 36-year-old Master Yiran (毅然法師) became abbot. The same year, Venerable Master Yuanzhou funded the establishment of the new Fujian Buddhism Academy (福建佛学院) on the site.

During the summer of 1996, in association with the Buddhist Association of China, more than 300 novice monks were initiated over a 108-day period. As of 2010, there are around 250 resident monks at the Guanghua Temple.

== Recent Abbots ==
- 1979–1986, Venerable Master Yuanzhou (圆拙法师)
- 1986–1990, Master Yiran (毅然法师)
- 1990–2021 Master Xuecheng (学诚法师)
- 2021–Present Master Benxing

== Structure ==
The temple's principal features are as follows:

- Paifang (牌坊)
- Fangsheng Pond (放生池; literally, Pool of Rebirth)
- Gaoshanmen (高山门/高山門) (Tall Mountain Gate)
- Tianwang Hall (天王殿) (Hall of the Four Heavenly Kings)
- Daxiongbao Hall (大雄宝殿) (Hall of the Great Hero)
- Dharma Hall (法堂) (Buddhist Hall)
- Qielan Hall (伽藍殿/伽蓝藍) (Sangharama Hall)
- Sanzang Hall (三藏殿) (Tripiţaka Hall)
- Dizang Hall (地藏菩萨殿) (Hall of Ksitigarbha)

In front of the temple there is a 10-metre stone staircase with 199 steps.

== See also ==
- Temple of Great Compassion
- Nanshan Temple
- Ashin Jinarakkhita

== Sources ==
- Huai-Chin, Nan (1999), Basic Buddhism. Exploring Buddhism and Zen, Mumbai: Jaico Publishing House
