= Nanshan Temple =

Nanshan Temple may refer to:

- Nanshan Temple (Sanya), a Buddhist temple in Sanya, Hainan Province, People's Republic of China
- Nanshan Temple (Zhangzhou), a Buddhist temple in Zhangzhou, Fujian Province, People's Republic of China
