= Baoning Temple =

Baoning Temple (simplified Chinese: 宝宁寺; traditional Chinese: 寶寧寺; pinyin: Bǎoníng Sì), may refer to:

- Baoning Temple (Changsha), Buddhist temple in Yuelu District of Changsha, Hunan
- Baoning Temple (Shuozhou), Buddhist temple in Youyu County, Shuozhou, Shanxi
- Madou Daitian Temple, also known as Baoning Temple, a temple in Nanshi Village, Madou District, Tainan, Taiwan
