= Baoning Temple (Changsha) =

Buddhist temple in Hunan, China

- 宝宁寺
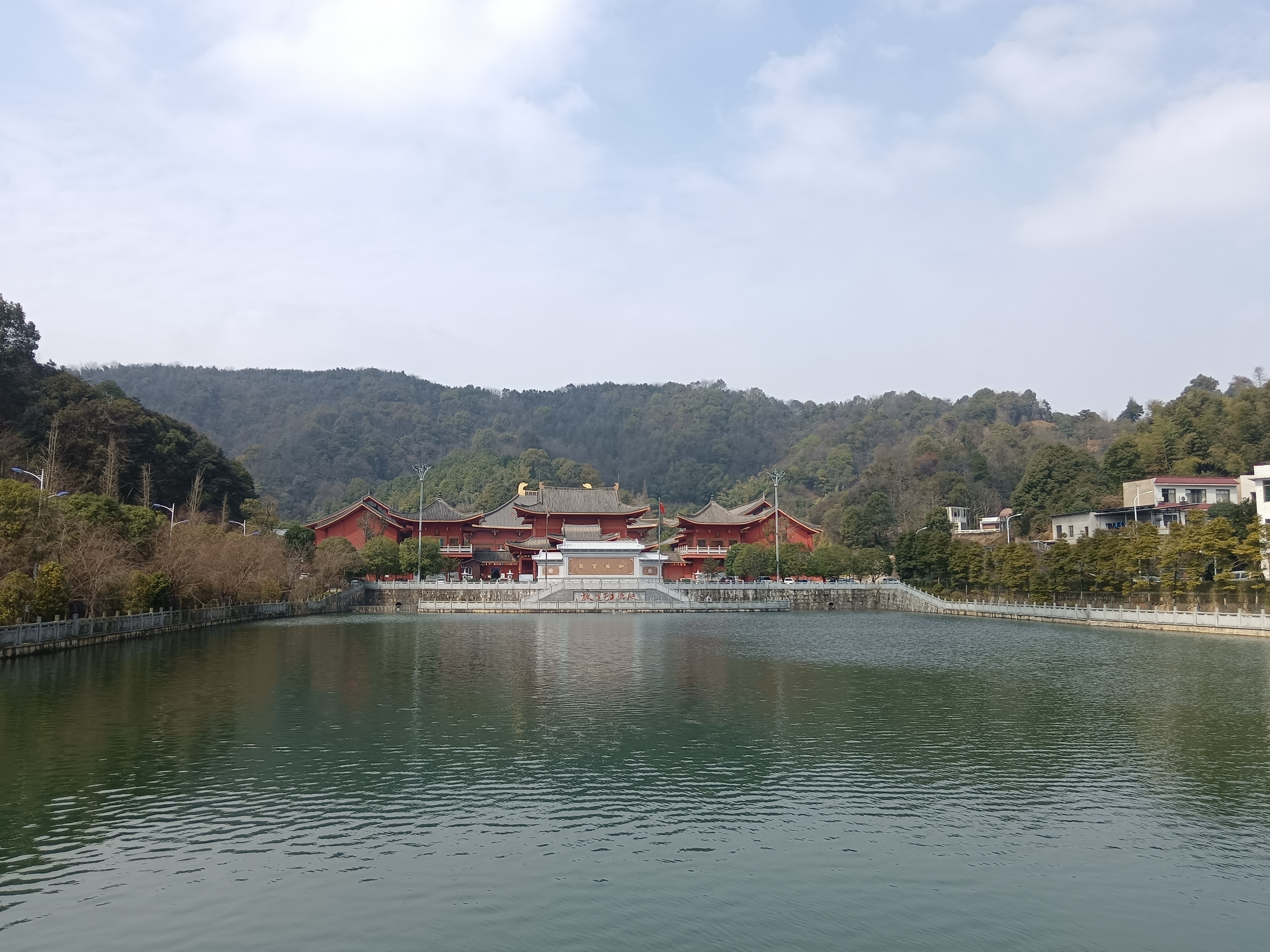
- Baoning Temple

- Location within Hunan

Religion
- Affiliation: Buddhism
- Sect: Caodong school

Location
- Location: Yuelu District of Changsha, Hunan, China
- Coordinates: 28°16′05″N 112°55′05″E

Architecture
- Style: Chinese architecture
- Founder: Master Cang (谷山藏禅师)
- Established: Tang dynasty (618–907)
- Completed: 2009 (reconstruction)

Baoning Temple (simplified Chinese: 宝宁寺; traditional Chinese: 寶寧寺; pinyin: Bǎoníng Sì) is a Buddhist temple located in Yuelu District of Changsha, Hunan, China.

== History ==
Baoning Temple was originally built by Master Cang (谷山藏禅师) in the Tang dynasty (618–907), and rebuilt by Baoning Renyong (保宁仁勇) in the late Tang dynasty.

In the Yongle period (1403–1424) of Ming dynasty (1368–1644), Zhu Hui (朱橞), the 19th son of Zhu Yuanzhang, received ordination as a monk because he was suppressed and persecuted by his elder brother Zhu Di.

In 1927, Changsha Suburban Farmers' Association (长沙郊区农民协会) was established in Baoning temple, where Xiao Jinguang and Teng Daiyuan often held meetings. During the Second Sino-Japanese War, the temple was one of the "Eight Temples in Changsha", and Hunan Buddhist Children's Hospital (湖南佛教慈儿院) was founded in the temple.

In the autumn of 1969, the Red Guards razed Baoning Temple to the ground and used it as a forest farm. On 22 November 2009, Yuelu District People's Government presided over the reconstruction of the temple.

== Architecture ==
Now the existing main buildings include Shanmen (Heavenly Kings Hall), Mahavira Hall, Bell tower, Drum tower, Buddha Recitation Hall, Hall of Sangharama Palace, Meditation Hall, Dining Room, etc.

=== Mahavira Hall ===
The Mahavira Hall is modeled on the East Hall of Foguang Temple on Wutai Mountain. The wood of dalbergia odorifera came from Laos, with copper tiles on the roofs. A total of more than 180 tons of anti-corrosion alloy copper are used. The hall is 47.95 metres (157.3 ft) long, 22 metres (72 ft) wide and 16.02 metres (52.6 ft) high with a construction area of 1,510 square metres (16,300 sq ft).

== Gallery ==
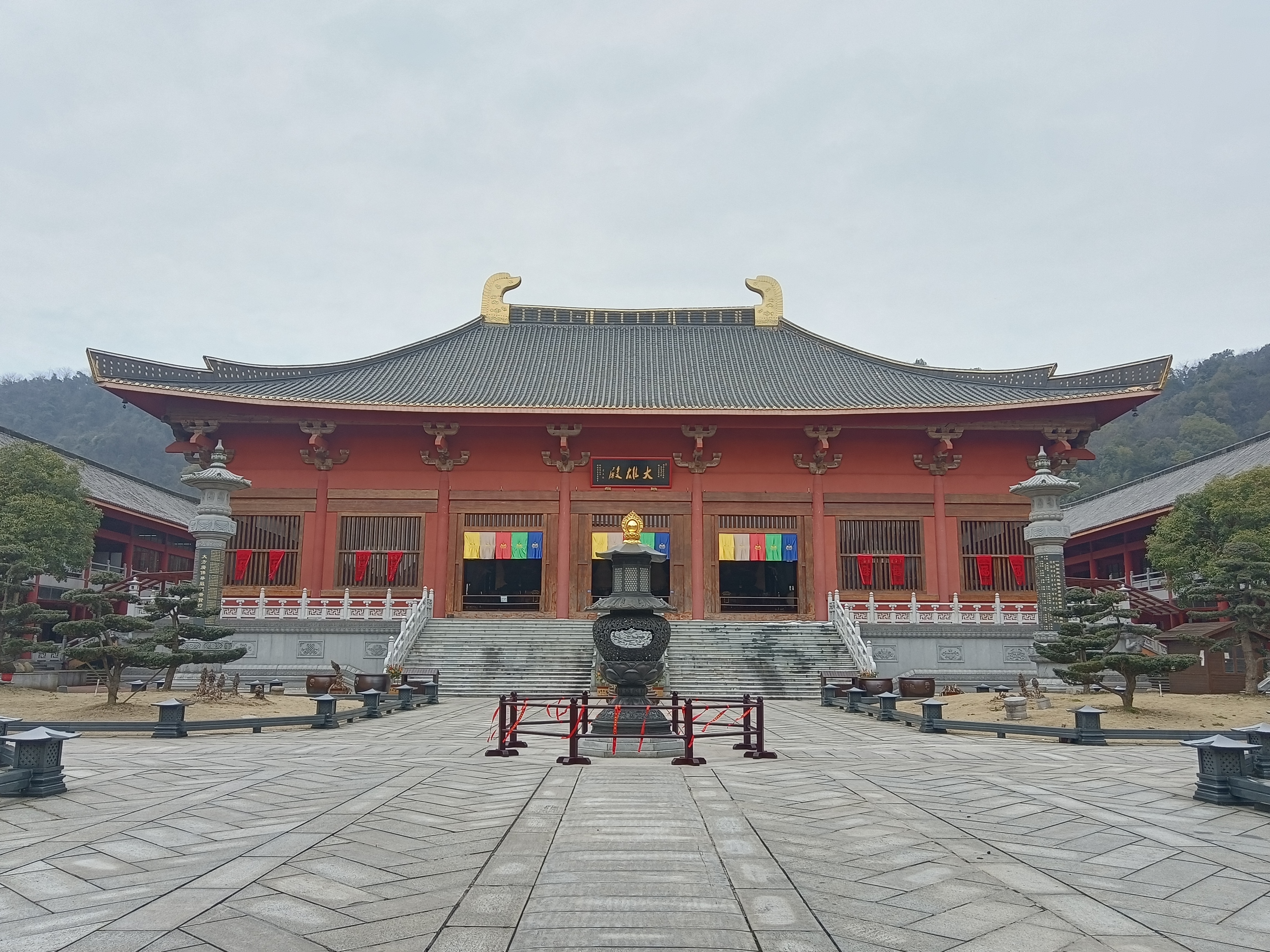
Mahavira Hall

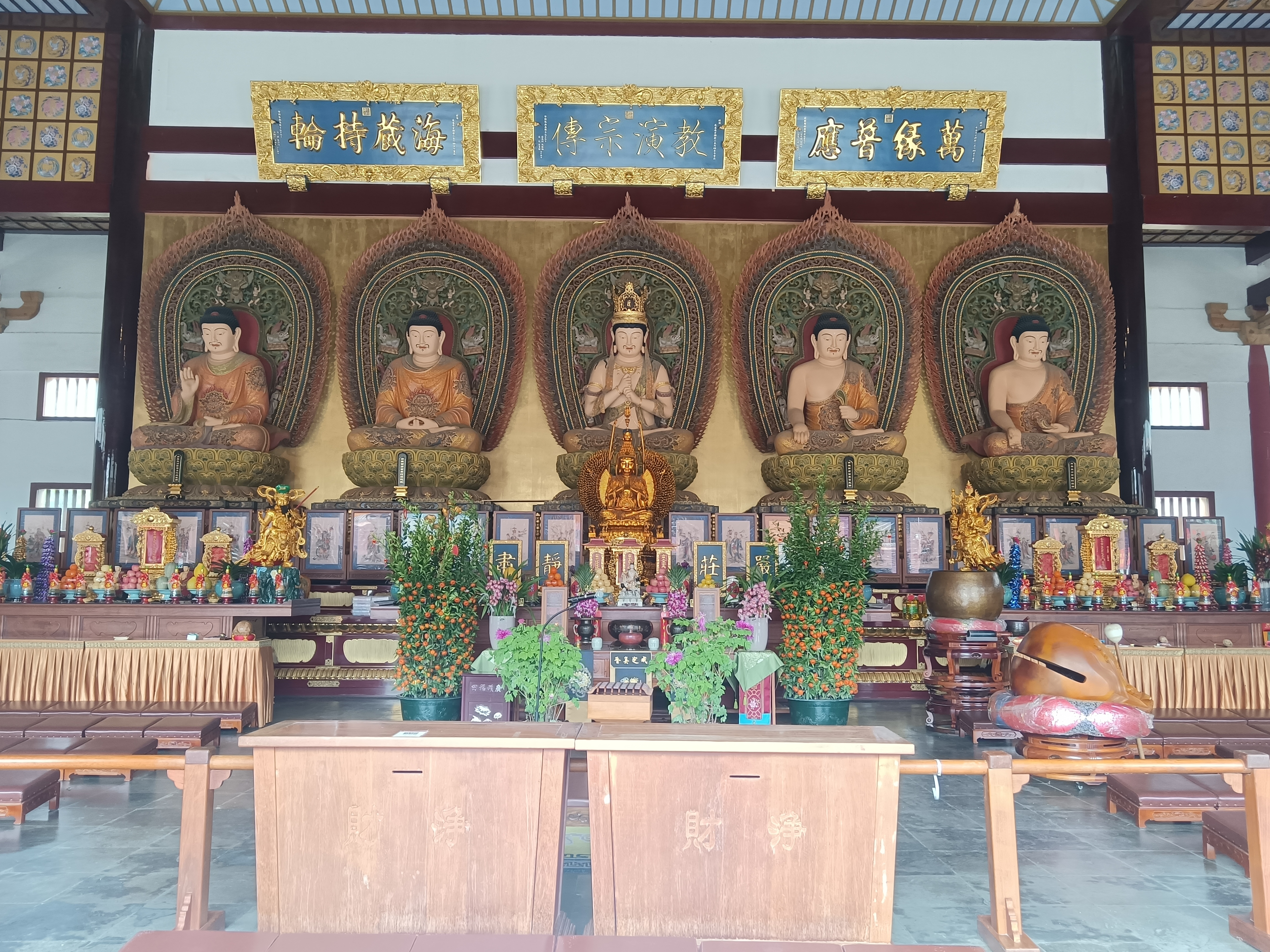
Statues of the Five Tathāgatas in the Mahavira Hall

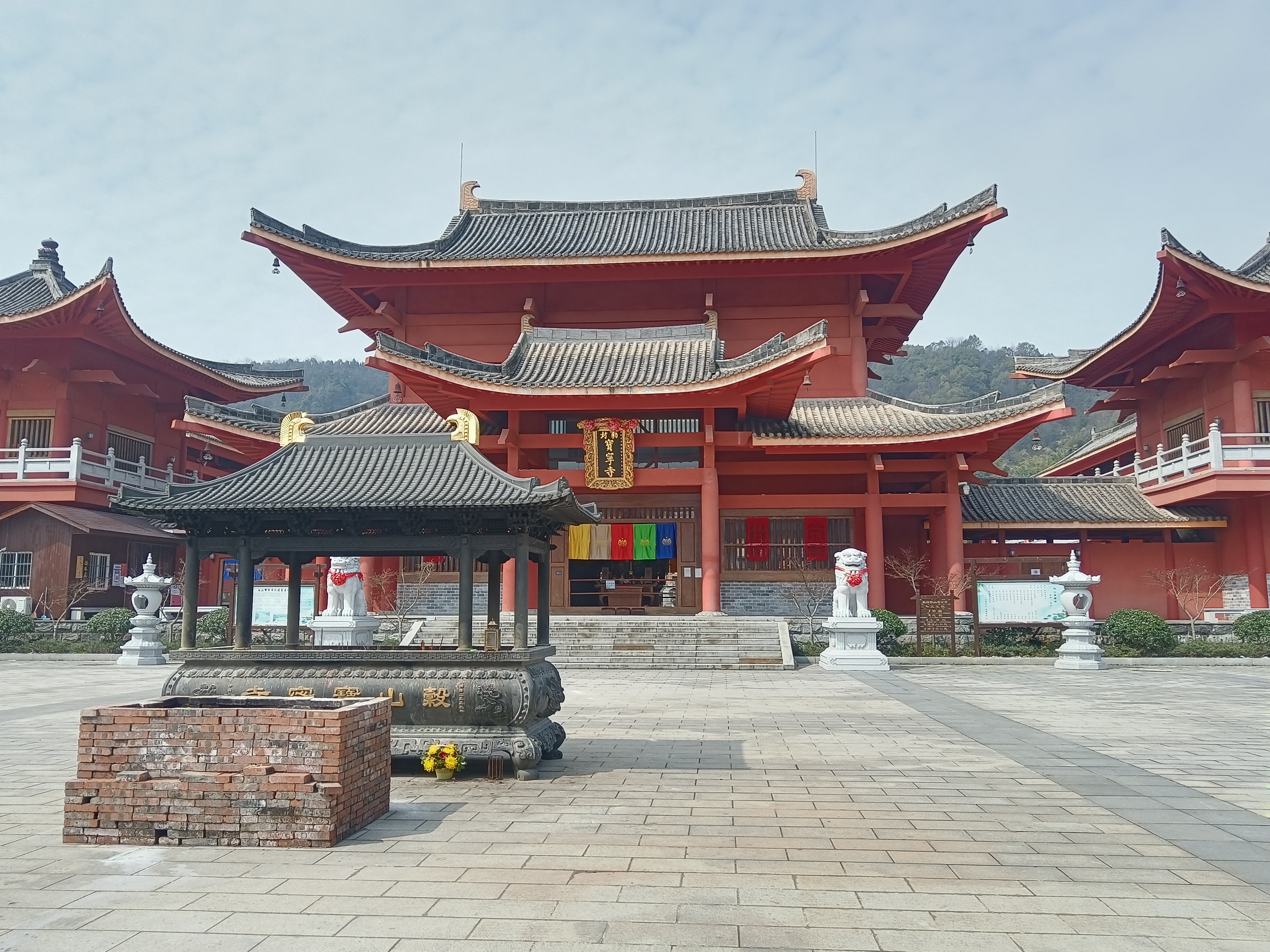
Mahavira Hall

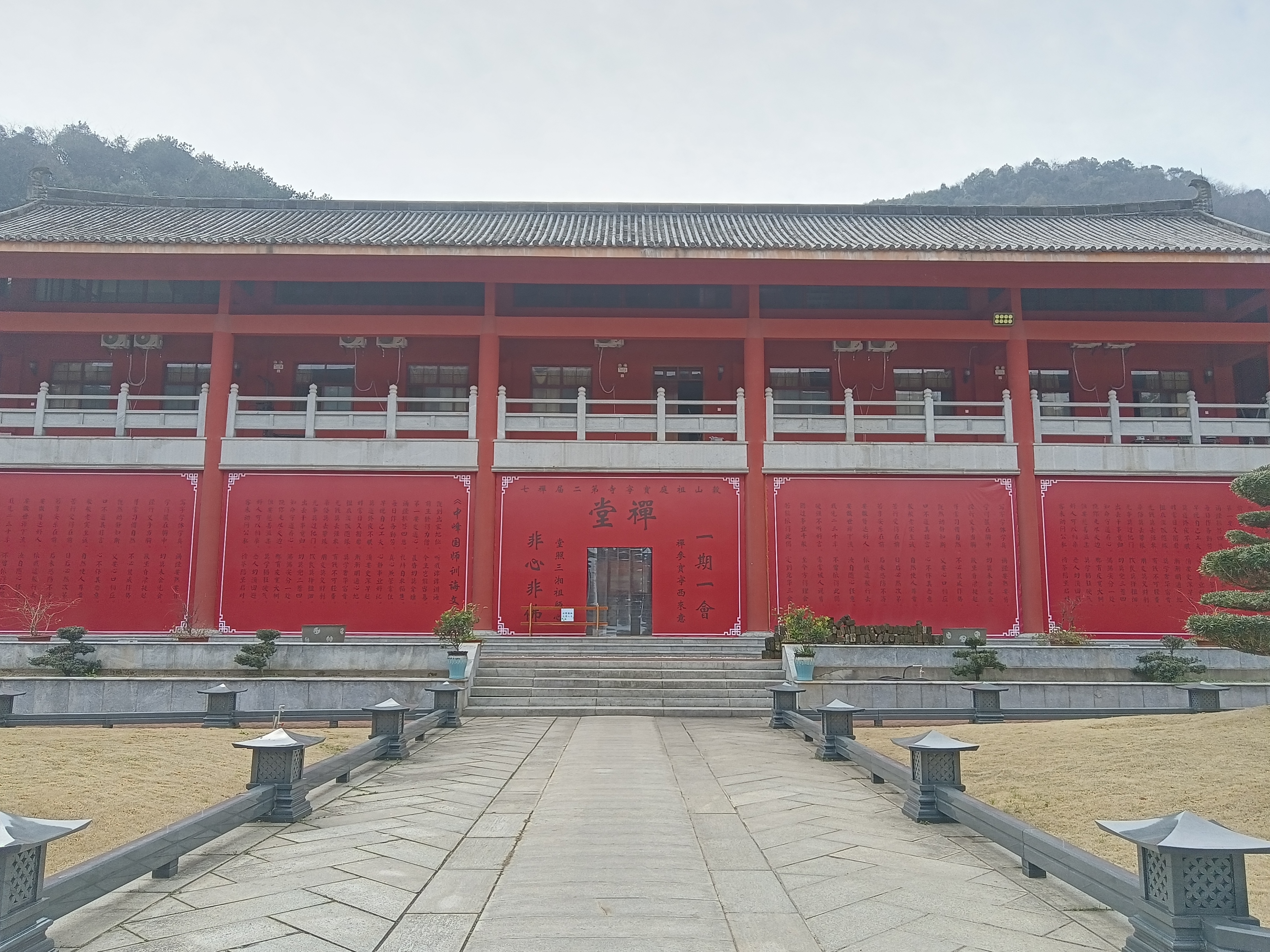
Meditation Hall

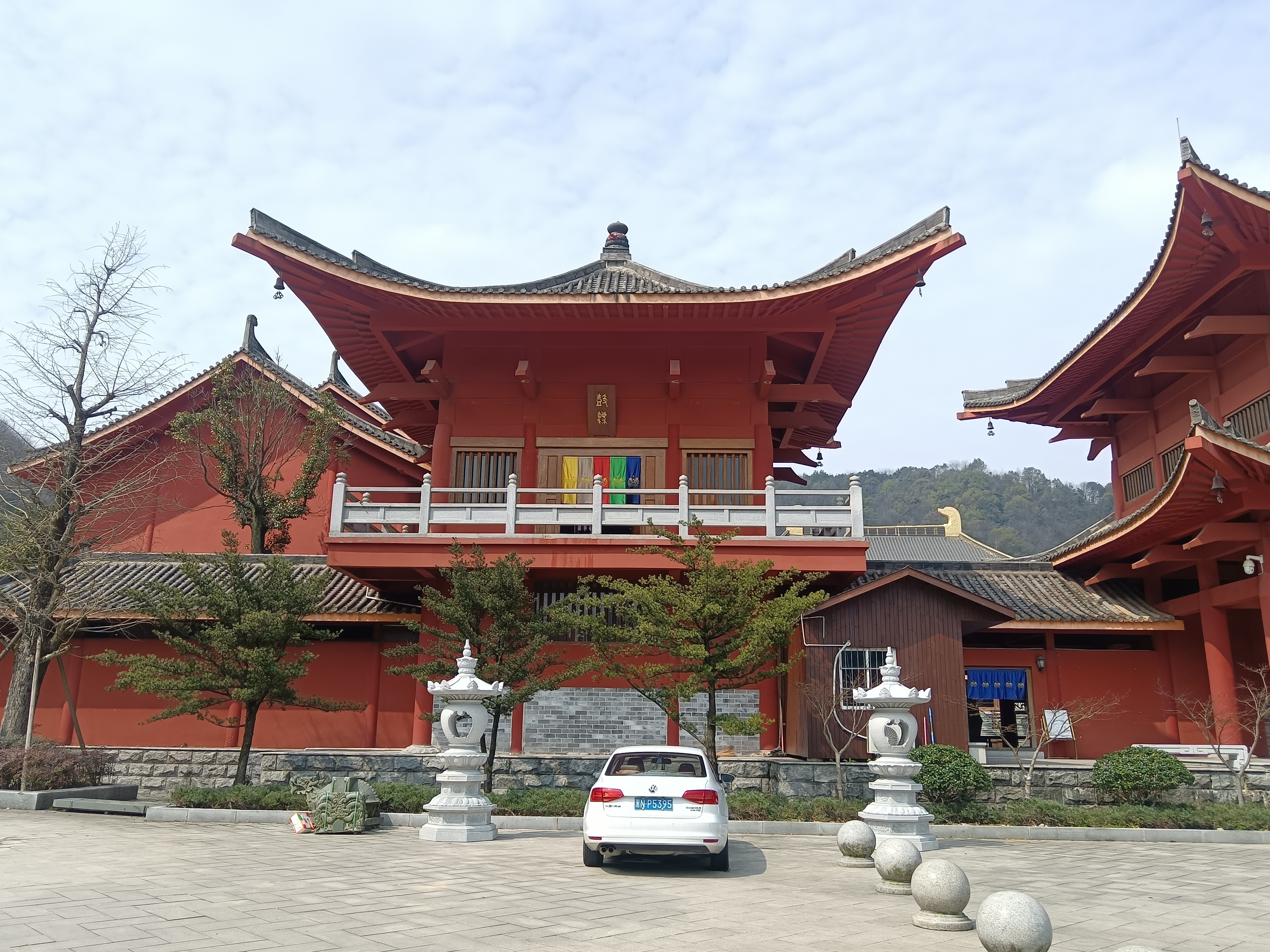
Drum tower

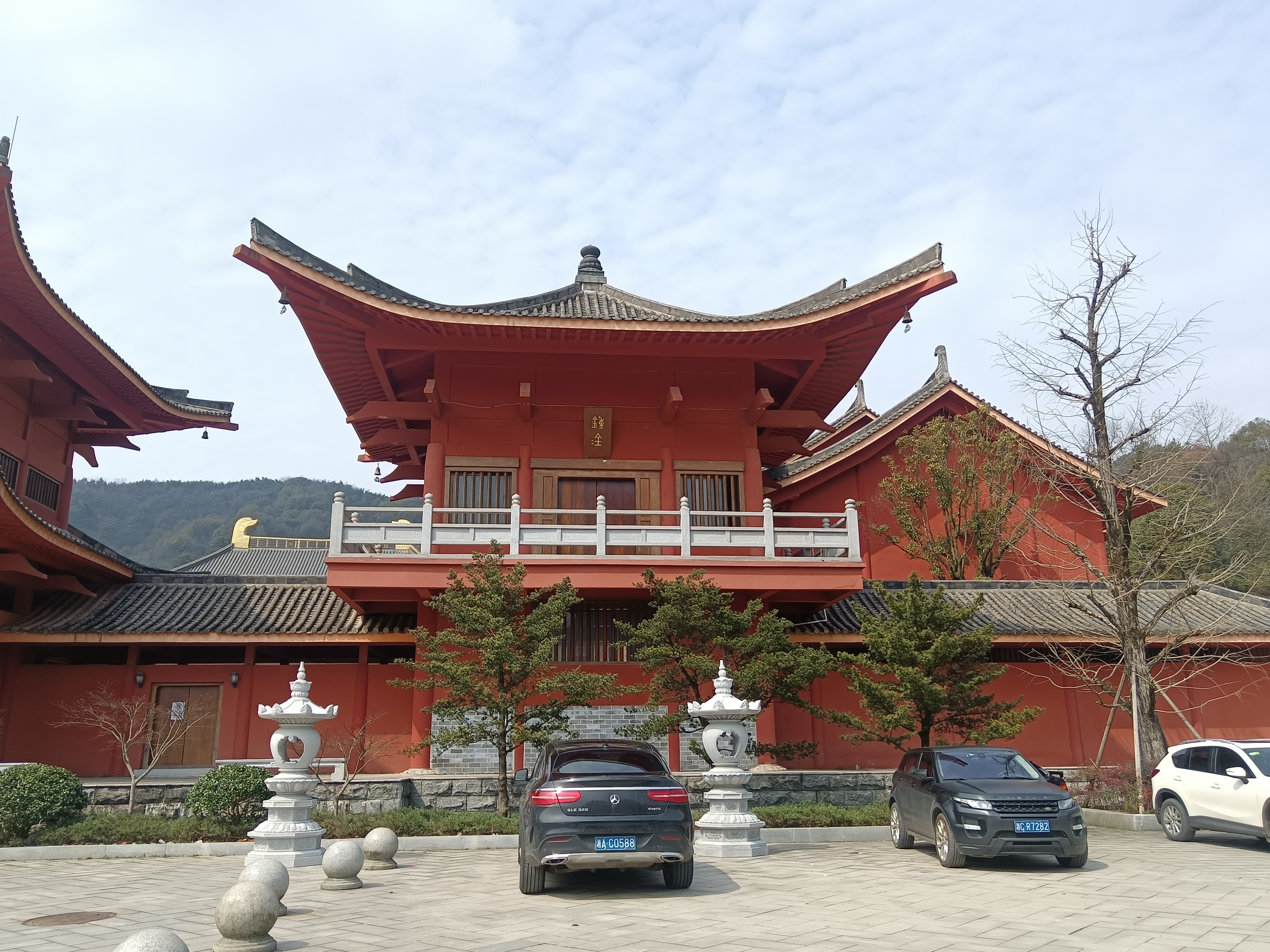
Bell tower
