= Ashin Jinarakkhita =

Indonesian Buddhist monk (1923–2002)

- Born: Tee Boan-an; 23 January 1923; Buitenzorg, Buitenzorg Residency, Dutch East Indies
- Died: 18 April 2002 (aged 79); North Jakarta, Jakarta, Indonesia
- Other name: Tizheng Lao Heshang
- Occupation: Buddhist monk

Ashin Jinarakkhita (23 January 1923 – 18 April 2002), (Note: In rememberance(sic) of Venerable Ashin Jinarakkhita. The Pioneer of Buddhism Revival in Indonesia) born Tee Boan-an (Chinese: 戴滿安; pinyin: Dài Mǎn'ān) was an Indonesian Buddhist monk best known for being the leading figure of reviving Buddhism in Indonesia. He was also known as Bhante Ashin, Tizheng Lao Heshang (體正老和尚), Teh-ching, Sukong (師公, (Note: Commemoration of Bhante Ashin’s 10th Parinirwana Year) Grandmaster), (Note: WITH HIS GRACE WE CAN ACHIEVE ANYTHING. Buddha Poornima 13 May 2006) and The Flying Monk. (Note: The devotees of Sai Baba - A Short Biography of Su Kong)

== Biography ==
=== Youth and early career ===
Jinarakkhita was born in Bogor, West Java on 23 January 1923 as Tee Boan-an (戴滿安), the third son of The Hong Gie and Tan Sep Moy. According to Juangari, as a young boy Tee Boan-an was already interested in yoga and "mystic powers". As a boy, he met a Theosophist from the Netherlands, who encouraged him to read "The Ancient Wisdom" and "The Secret Doctrines". When he was a teenager, Tee Boan-an practiced meditation at Gede Mountain and Salak Mountain, and visited "virtuous people" and temples to gain spiritual knowledge.

After attending the HBS at Jakarta and the Technical School in Bandung, he left in 1946 for the Netherlands to study chemistry at Groningen University. There he also continued his interest in Theosophy. He also learnt Pali and Sanskrit languages from Dr. Van Der Leeuw, and acquired fluency in English, German, French, and Dutch. During holidays, he went to France, where he had the opportunity to attend lectures by Jiddu Krishnamurti.

In 1951 he returned to Indonesia, where he worked as a teacher at several secondary schools in Jakarta, but also took an active interest in religion.

=== Buddhist ordination ===
Tee Boan-an became president of the Indonesian Sam Kauw Union (Note: See (Note: Ven. Ditthisampanno, Buddhism in Indonesia, Past and Present) for more info on the Sam Kauw Union) as well as the vice-president of the central committee of the Indonesian Theosophy Youth. Buddhism was reintroduced in Indonesia in the beginning of the 20th century by the Theosophical Society, which played a central role in the popularisation of Buddhism in the west, and the revival of Buddhism in Sri Lanka. In Indonesia the Theosophical Society found adherents among the Dutch colonials, Chinese immigrants, and Indonesian noblemen. Buddhism spread in the form of Theravada and Mahayana. Theravadin Buddhists had contacts with Buddhist Orders in Sri Lanka, Burma and Thailand, while Chinese Mahayana priests from China were invited by the Indonesian-Chinese Buddhist communities.

Tee Boan-an received ordination as a Mahayana Ch'an novice monk on 29 July 1953, and received the name Tizheng (體正, Te Cheng) from the Chinese Mahayana priest Benqing (Pen Ching/Pen Cheng) Lao Heshang, from the Guanghua Monastery in Putian, China. (Note: Andre van der Braak, Vijf bezoeken aan China verder, Vrienden van het Boeddhisme, januari 2015]) (Note: 本清老和尚, (Note: Buddhayana) also known as Y.A. Mahasthavira Arya Mula., Pen Ching Lau He Sang (pinyin: Benqing Lao Heshang), Pun-Cheng, and Pen Cheng. Pen Cheng (1878 or 1887-1962) was born at Wu Chen Li village, at Putian district, Fujian, China. He was trained in Kuang Hua Ssu 廣化寺 (Kuang Hua, Guanghua Temple, "Vast Influence", in Fo Tiën (Fujian), a monastery which was influenced by Hsu Yun, abbot of Ku Shan Ssu (Gu Shan) monastery in Fo Tiën (see also Charles Luk (Lu K'uan Yü), "Chan and Zen Teaching"). Benqing came to Indonesia in the beginning of the 20th century. This was in the time of the so-called Buddhist Revival, when, under influence of the western culture, attempt were being made to revitalize Chinese Buddhism. Most notable were the Human-Life Buddhism of Taixu, and the Humanistic Buddhism of Yinshun.) Eventually, Tizheng received dharma transmission from Benqing.

After the Communists took over power in China in 1949, Buddhist monasteries were closed in China, and Indonesia tried to diminish Chinese influences in Indonesia. For these reasons, further Ch'an-training in China was problematic, and Benqing sent Tizheng to Burma in 1953, where he practiced Satipatthana Meditation under Mahasi Sayadaw. Tizheng was ordained as a Theravada monk in 1954, and received the name Ashin Jinarakkhita. The same year he returned to Indonesia,

=== Buddhist revival in Indonesia ===
Jinarakkhita was instrumental in the revival of Buddhism in Indonesia. He realised that Buddhism had to adapt to Indonesian culture to survive; otherwise it would remain a foreign "fremdkörper". (Note: The same strategy was being followed by Catholic missionaries like the Divine Word Missionaries (SVD) and the Jesuits, who were aware of the value of the Javanese culture and identity.)

In 1955 Jinarakkhita formed the first Indonesian Buddhist lay organisation, Persaudaraan Upasaka Upasika Indonesia (PUUI). In 1957, the PUUI was integrated into the Indonesian Buddhist Association (Perhimpunan Buddhis Indonesia, Perbudi), in which both Theravada and Mahayana priesthoods were united. Nowadays, the PUUI is called Majelis Buddhayana Indonesia (MBI). (Note: Buddhayana)

In 1960 Jinarakkhita established the Sangha Suci Indonesia, as a monastic organisation. In 1963 the name was changed to Maha Sangha of Indonesia, and in 1974 the name was changed into Sangha Agung Indonesia. It is a community of monastics from the Theravada, Mahayana and Tantrayana traditions.

In 1965, after a coup-attempt, Buddhist organisations had to comply with the first principle of the Indonesian state ideology, Pancasila, the belief in one supreme God. All organisations that doubted or denied the existence of God were outlawed. this posed a problem for Indonesian Buddhism, which was solved by Jinarakkhita by presenting nibbana as the Theravada "God", and Adi-Buddha, the primaeval Buddha of the region's previous Mantrayana Buddhism, as the Mahayana "God". According to Jinarakkhita, the concept of Adi Buddha was found in the tenth-century Javanese Buddhist text Sang Hyang Kamhayanikan.

Another important factor in the Buddhist revival was the use of a new category of lay Buddhist teachers. Those who were older Buddhists without a formal dharma transmission or authorisation, but with a lot of life-experience. Those elder teachers were sanctioned by Jinarakkhita, and instituted new meditation-centers, and organised meetings and lectures. (Note: The use of lay-teachers was not new in Indonesia. In conjunction with missionaries from the Divine Word Missionaries (SVD) and the Jesuits, "lay-apostles" in the first half of the 20th century spread and practiced the Gosple. Exemplary are the Schmutzer family, who established the Catholic Ganjuran Church in Ganjuran, Bantul, Java.)

=== Death ===
Jinarakkhita died on Thursday 18 April 2002 in Pluit Hospital, North Jakarta. His ashes and relics were brought back to Sakyavanaram Temple at Cipendawa Cliff, Pacet, Cianjur West Java, where Jinarakkhita lived.

== Teachings ==
Jinarakkhita had a liberal teaching on Buddhism. According to Jinarakkhita, orang suci ("saints") can be found everywhere, and religious experience is personal and unique. Each person has to pursue his or her own path. In his teachings he often quoted non-Buddhists, such as Ranggawarsita, and he admired Sai Baba.

Love, as represented by Guanyin, is essential:

Duty is most important. The body is a temple. You are a projection of love. Love the Earth, love the air, love the water, love the fire. Love the part of self that is of the ethers.

== Students ==
Jinarakkhita had students and followers in both Indonesia and other countries. One of them is Ton Lathouwers, a Dutch lay student who received dharma transmission in the Rinzai-lineage in 1987, and founded the Maha Karuna Ch'an organisation in the Netherlands.

== See also ==
- Buddhism in Indonesia
- Vihara Buddhagaya Watugong
- Vipassana Movement
- Mahasi Sayadaw
- Guanghua Temple
- Parwati Soepangat
- Sanghyang Adi Buddha

== Sources ==
=== Published sources ===
- Chia, Jack Meng-Tat (2018), "Neither Mahāyāna Nor Theravāda: Ashin Jinarakkhita and the Indonesian Buddhayāna Movement", History of Religions
- Chia, Jack Meng-Tat (2020), Monks in Motion: Buddhism and Modernity across the South China Sea, Oxford University Press
- Harvey, Peter (1995), An introduction to Buddhism. Teachings, history and practices, Cambridge University Press
- Hsüan Hua (2003), Pictorial Biography of Venerable Master Hsu Yun, Dharma Realm Buddhist Association
- Huai-Chin, Nan (1999), Basic Buddhism. Exploring Buddhism and Zen, Mumbai: Jaico Publishing House
- Juangari, Edij (1995), Menabur Benih Dharma di Nusantara
- Lathouwers, Ton (2008), Het grote verschil tussen een snauw en een bloemetje. In: Maha Karuna Bericht, 2008, nummer 3, pagina 3-7
- Maha Karuna Ch'an (n.d.), Ingaan tot het hart dat luistert. Sutrateksten uit de Maha Karuna Ch'an traditie
- McMahan, David L. (2008), The Making of Buddhist Modernism, Oxford University Press, ISBN 9780195183276
- Melton, J. Gordon; Baumann, Martin (2010), Religions of the World, Second Edition: A Comprehensive Encyclopedia of Beliefs and Practices, ABC-CLIO
- Missiemuseum Steyl (n.d.), Christelijke-Javaanse Kunst 1924-1927
- Naik, C.D. (2010), Buddhism and Dalits: Social Philosophy and Traditions, Gyan Publishing House
- Ricklefs, Merle Calvin (2007), Polarising Javanese Society: Islamic and Other Visions, C. 1830-1930, NUS Press
- Suryadinata, Leo (1995), Prominent Indonesian Chinese: Biographical Sketches, Institute of Southeast Asian Studies
- Verboven, Lucette (1992), Je kunt er niet uitvallen. Interview met Ton Lathouwers. In: Zen, jaargang 13, januari 1992, nummer 48
