= Temple of Great Compassion =

Buddhist temple in Tianjin, China

- 大悲院
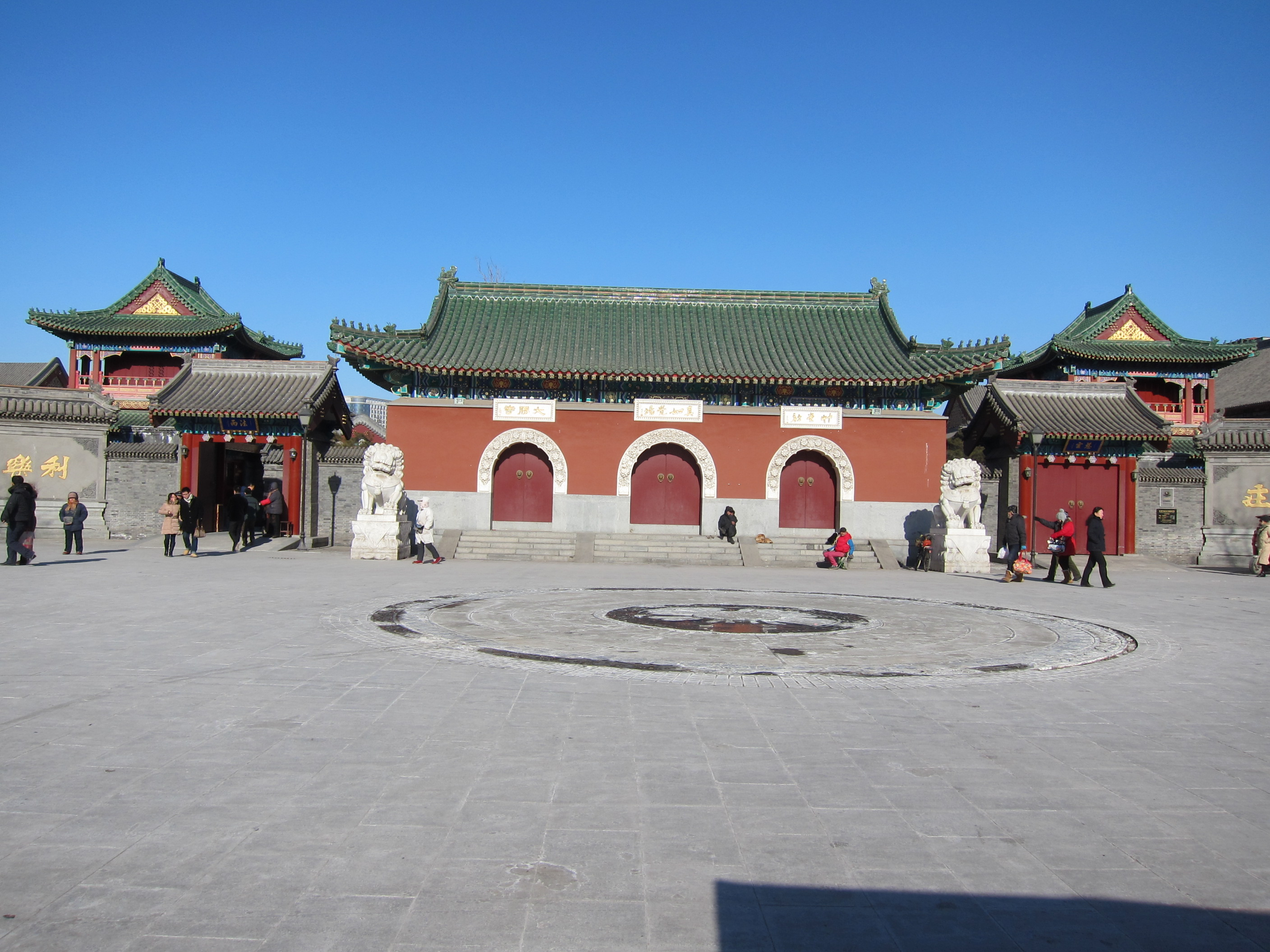
- Temple of Great Compassion

- Location within Tianjin

Religion
- Affiliation: Buddhism
- Sect: Chan Buddhism

Location
- Location: Tianjin, China
- Interactive map of Temple of Great Compassion
- Coordinates: 39°09′18″N 117°11′02″E

Architecture
- Style: Chinese architecture
- Established: 1644–1661
- Completed: 1875 (reconstruction)

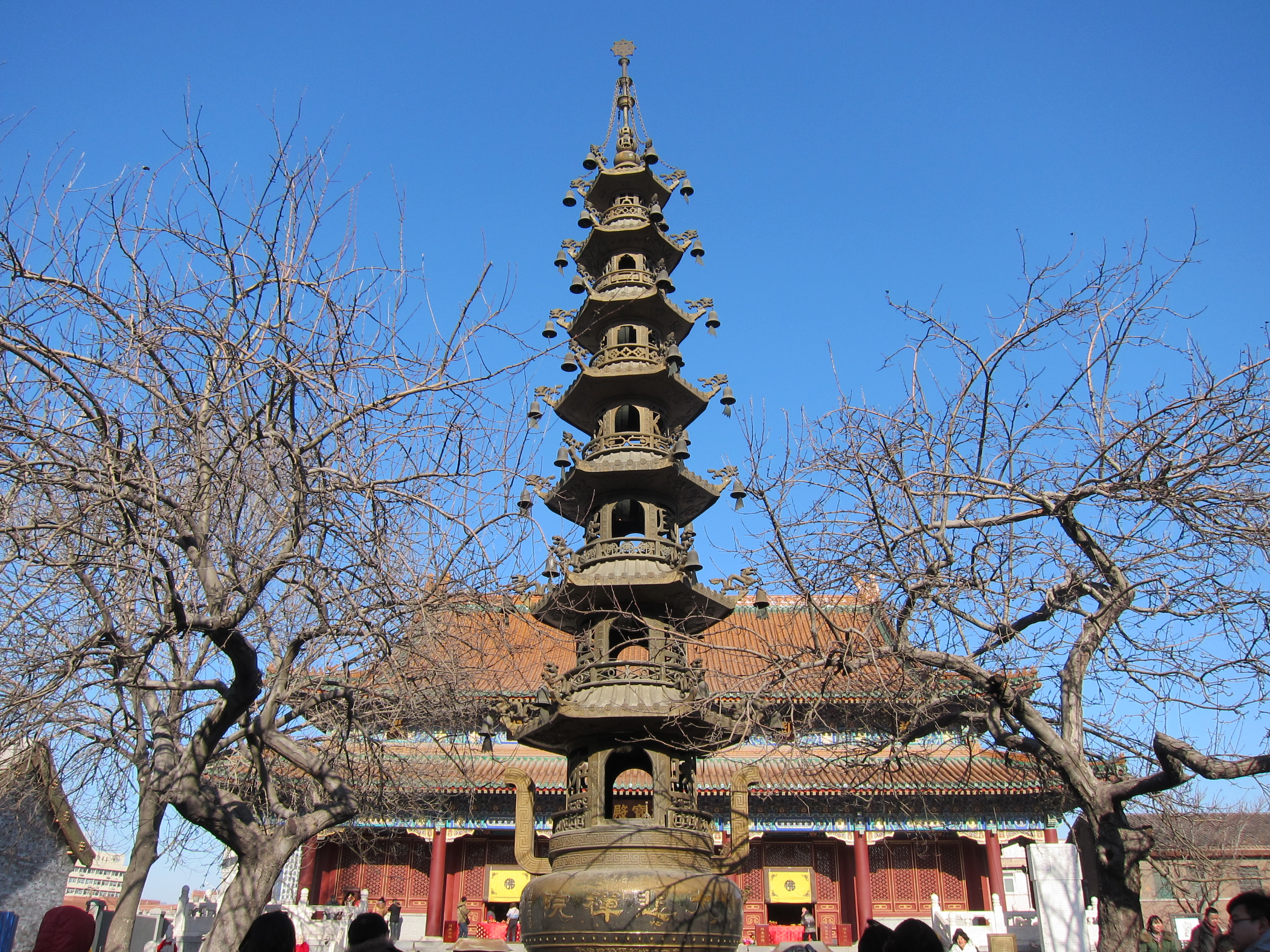
Pagoda at the temple

The Temple of Great Compassion or Dabei Yuan (Chinese: 大悲院; pinyin: Dàbēi Yuàn) is a Chan Buddhist temple in Tianjin, China.

== Background ==
The monastery was first built during the Qing dynasty, but has been heavily rebuilt and renovated since and consists now of the West Monastery from 1669 and the East Monastery from 1940 and is the largest and oldest one in the town. The temple covers an area of 10,600 m^{2} (114,000 ft²). The temple also houses the Tianjin Buddhist Institute, which exhibits quite many ancient statues. The Dabei Buddhist Monastery is made up of two parts: old monastery and new monastery.

== Old and new ==
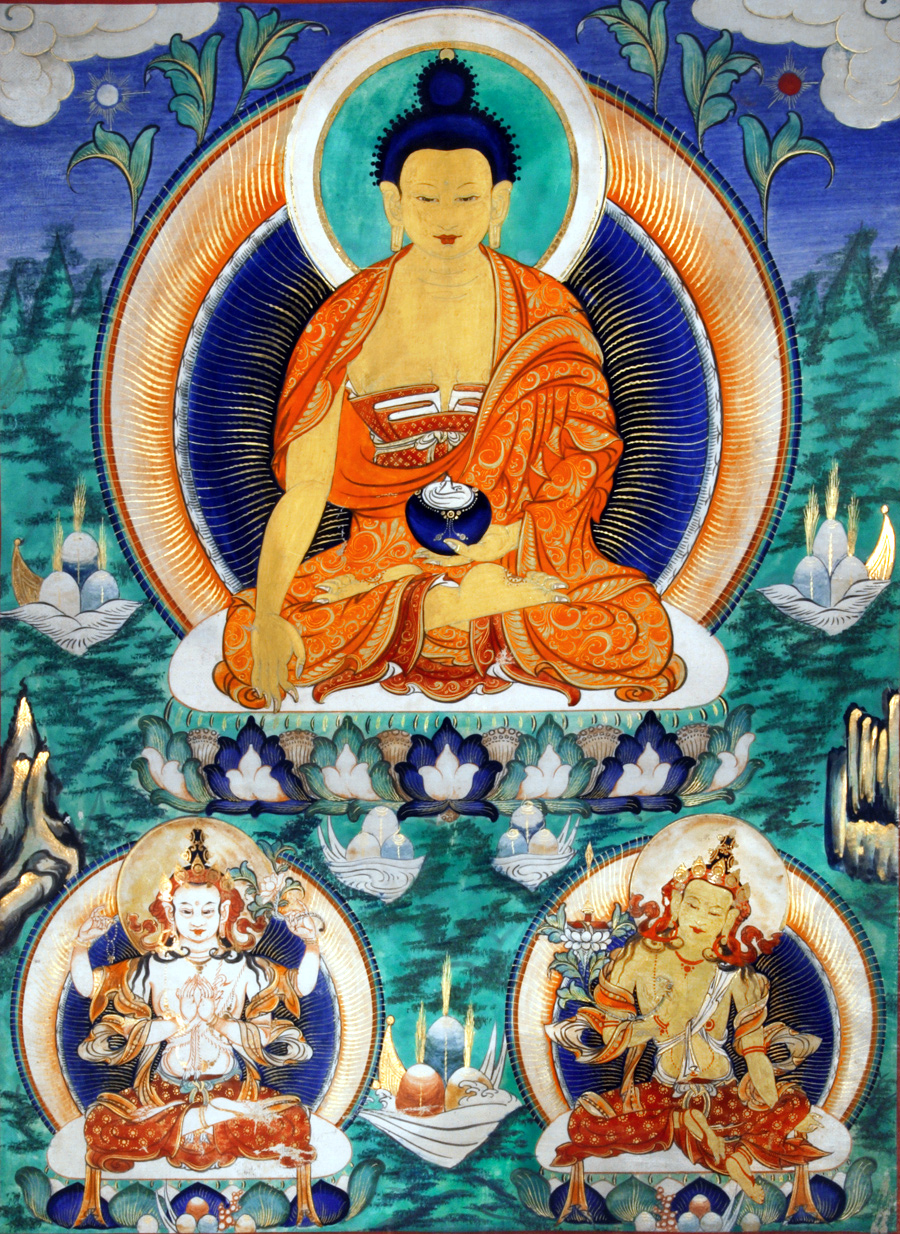
A thanka painting of Sakyamuni

The old monastery refers to the three great halls in the west yard. The construction of the old monastery was started in the beginning of the Qing dynasty and was renovated in the eighth year of the reign of the Kangxi Emperor in the Qing dynasty. The east yard features the new monasteries. The statue of Sakyamuni oblated in the Daxiong Palace from the east yard was created during the Qing dynasty. The whole Sakyamuni statue is 7 meters high, 6 tons in weight, with 9,999 small Buddhas carved on its lotus throne. Inside the Great Compassion hall is a 3.6 meters high mud statue of the Thousand-hand Kwan-yin is oblated.

== Xuanzang ==
A depiction of the Chinese monk Xuanzang on his journey to India

The monastery was once famous for holding a skull relic of Xuanzang who died in 664, however, the relic was presented to India in 1956 when it was taken to Nalanda - allegedly by the Dalai Lama - and presented to India. The relic is now in the Patna museum. And from then on, the Great Compassion monastery uses the image of the Xuanzang master instead of his spirit bones for worshiping the Buddha. There are memorials for the Buddhist monks Xuanzang and Hong Yi in the east yard, while the west yard has become an office for the Cultural Relic Palace, Abbot Palace and Chinese Buddhism Association Tianjin Branch. In the Cultural Relic Palace of the west yard, there are many collections from every dynasties since the Wei and Jin period including hundreds of Buddha statues which are made of various materials like bronze, iron, stone and wood.

== Cultural value ==
The cultural value of the temple concentrates on its mural art and its central status of local culture.
