= Vihara Buddhagaya Watugong =

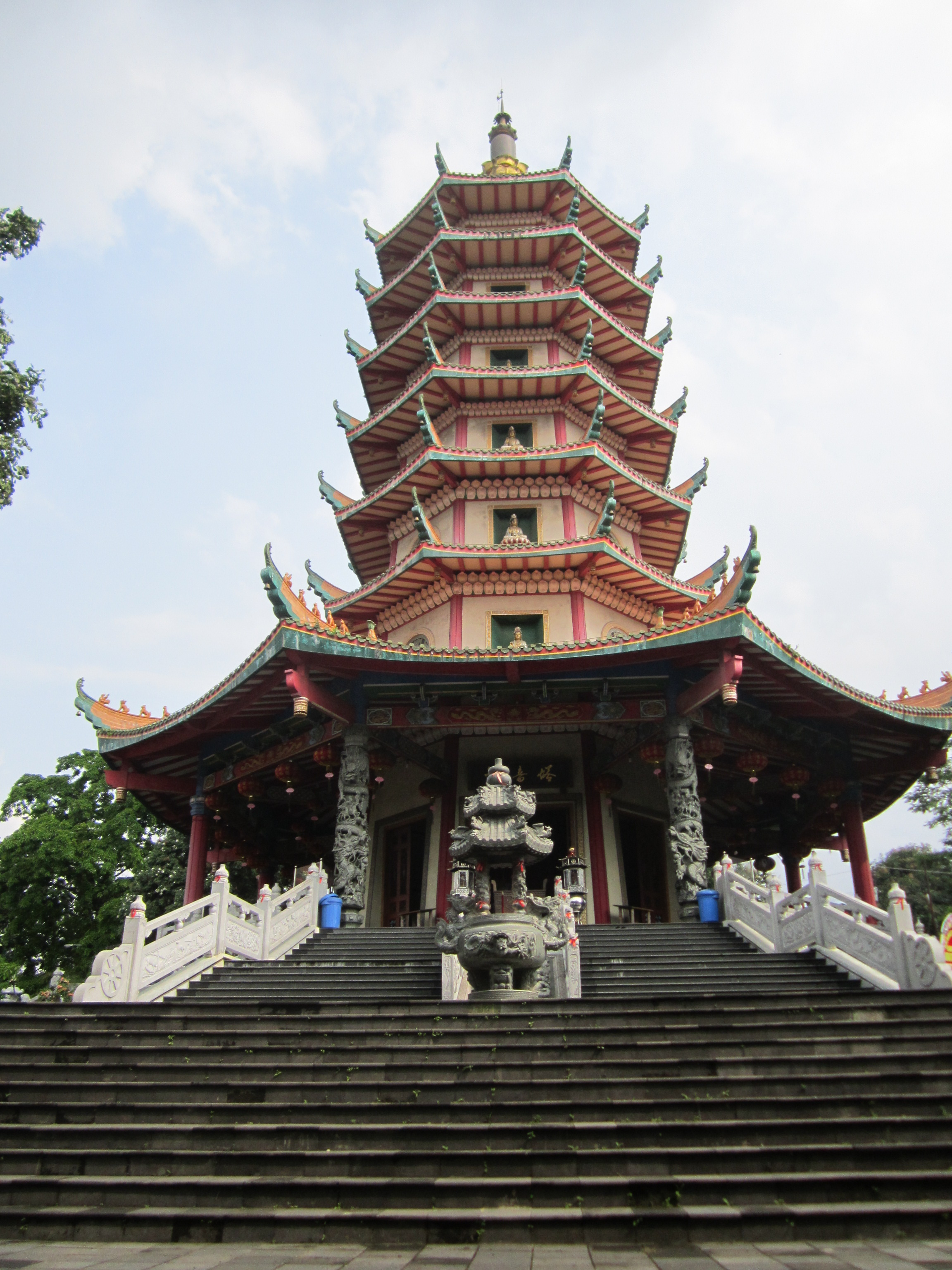
- Pagoda Avalokitesvara, Bodh Gaya Watugong
- Interactive map of the Vihara Buddhagaya Watugong area

General information
- Type: Religious Temple (Building)
- Architectural style: Chinese Oriental & Thailand
- Location: Semarang, Central Java, Indonesia, Perintis Kemerdekaan Road, Banyumanik, Semarang Central Java
- Coordinates: 7°05′10″S 110°24′32″E
- Construction started: October 19, 1955

Vihara Buddhagaya Watugong also known as Vihara Buddhagaya (in English Vihara Bodh Gaya Watugong and Vihara Bodh Gaya respectively) is a Buddhist temple located in Semarang, Indonesia.

== Layout ==
The precise location is in Pudakpayung, Banyumanik in front of the Kodam IV/Diponegoro military base. Vihara Bodh Gaya Watugong cultural complex consists of two main buildings/temples: Pagoda Avalokitesvara and Pagoda Dhammasala. It is surrounded by smaller temples and other buildings. The two temples incorporate classic oriental design and architecture.

Other buildings include the Watugong rock, Borobudur plaza, Kuti Meditasi, Kuti Bhikku, public reading park and library, Buddha Parinibana, Abhaya Mudra and the Bodhi tree.

The tallest tower stands at 45 meters, the tallest pagoda tower in Indonesia. A five-meter statue of the Guanyin Bodhisattva is located in one of the towers. This complex was formerly used exclusively as a Buddhist religious temple. With its classical oriental design and architectural heritage, the Vihara Bodh Gaya evolved to become a cultural and heritage tourism site by the local populace and the government of Semarang.

== History ==
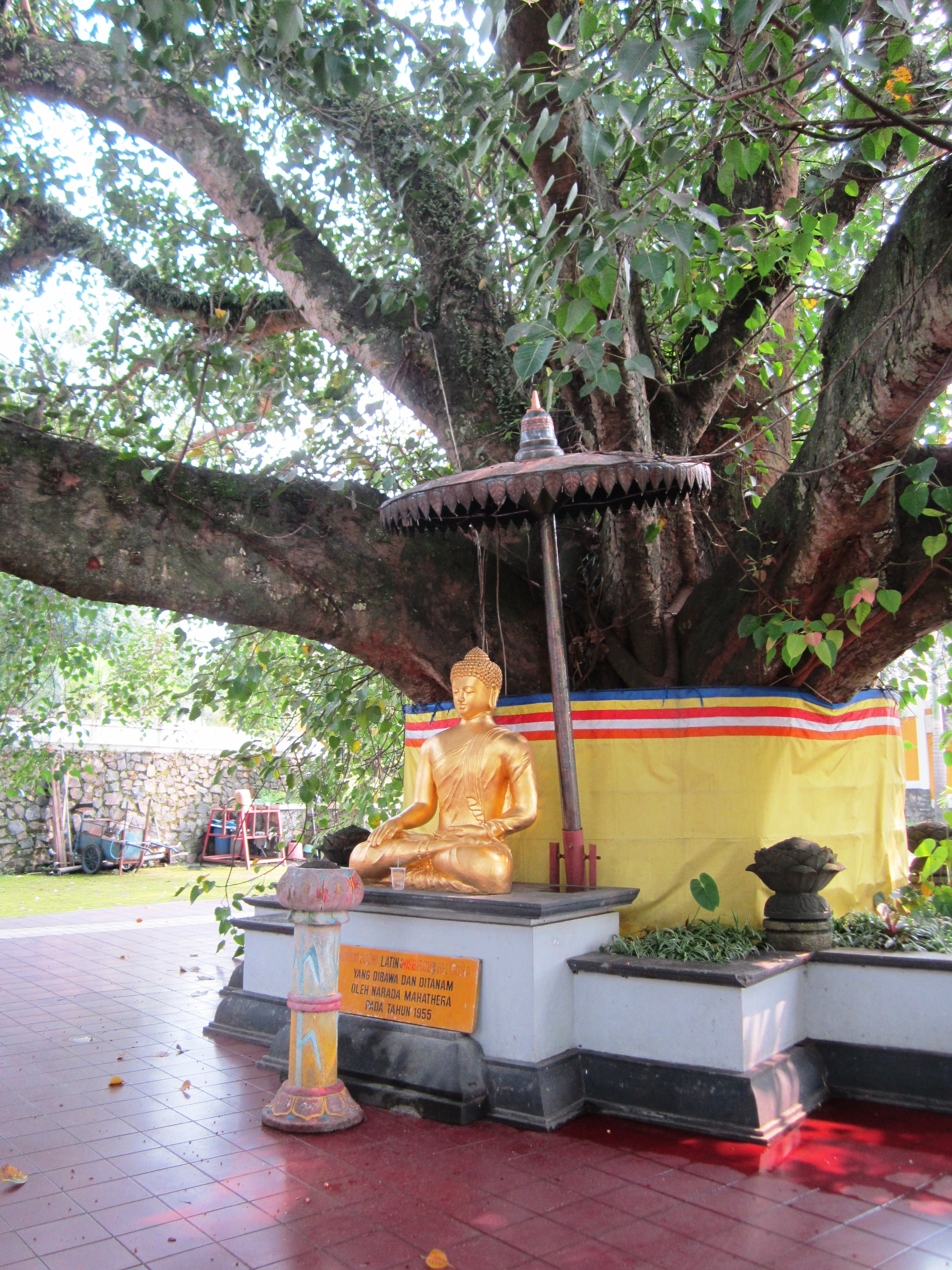
Bodhi tree planted within the Watugong complex in 1955.

The Watugong complex stretches back to the Majapahit. Buddhism was then the official religion. With the fall of Majapahit empire and the spread of Islam, the practice of Buddhism fell drastically.

Buddhism reemerged 500 years later. The first attempt to propagate Buddhism came in the Dutch colonial era through Ashin Jinarakkhita with the encouragement of Narada Maha Thera. In 1955, Semarang/Chinese landlord Goei Thwan Ling was so impressed by Ashin Jinarakkhita at the Vesak 2549 celebrations at Borobudur temple that he donated some of his land to build the temple complex Vihara Bodh Gaya. The temple complex was devoted to teaching Buddhism and the development of Buddhist religion.

By the end of 1955, Ashin Jinarakkhita maintained a permanent residence at the Bodh Gaya temple complex.

In February 2001, the complex underwent major renovations under Sangha Theravada, after eight years of neglect. Renovations started with the Dhammasala building which finished on November 3, 2002. The building was reopened by the Central Java Governor at the time of H. Mardiyanto. Other buildings followed. The Pagoda Avalokitesvara started renovations in November 2004 and reopened on July 14, 2005.

== Dhammasala Temple ==
The Dhammasala temple is one of the main buildings. It is located on the right side of the vihara. A two storey building with the first floor used as a function hall and the second floor used for worship, dedicate to a statue of Lord Buddha. It has a total capacity of 1000 worshippers. The staircase to the prayer hall is outside the building. No interior staircase exists.

The building is unique and attractive to many tourists because of the oriental architecture that contrasts with traditional Javanese pendhapa architecture surrounding the complex.

Another centerpiece is a 5-meter brass statue of sitting Buddha which resembles the Buddha statue at Candi Mendut. Other functions are organizational, such as the annual local or international Buddhist convention managed by Vihara Bodh Gaya Watugong foundation.

== Pagoda Avalokitesvara ==
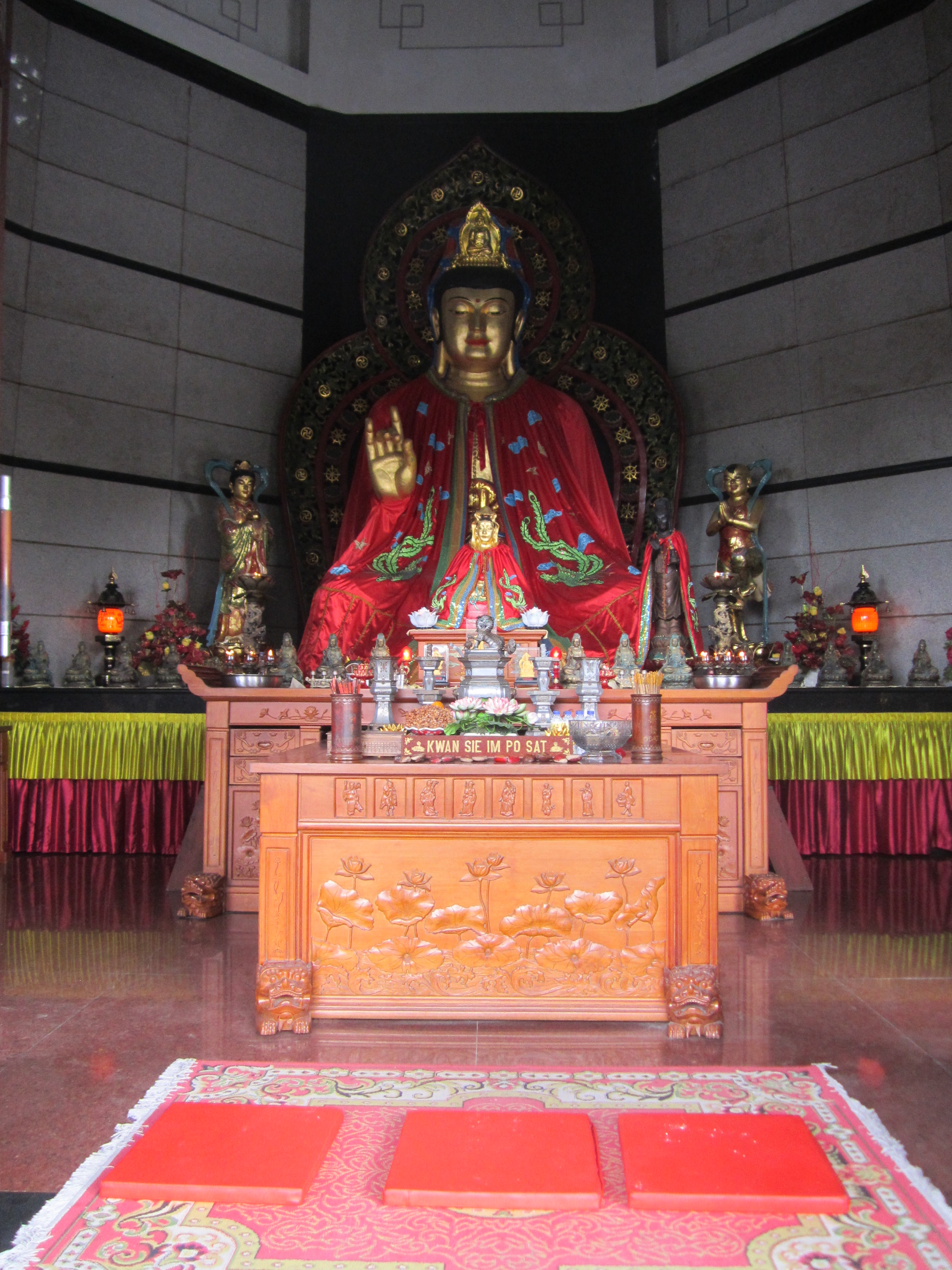
A 5-meter Guanyin statue inside Pagoda Avalokitesvara.

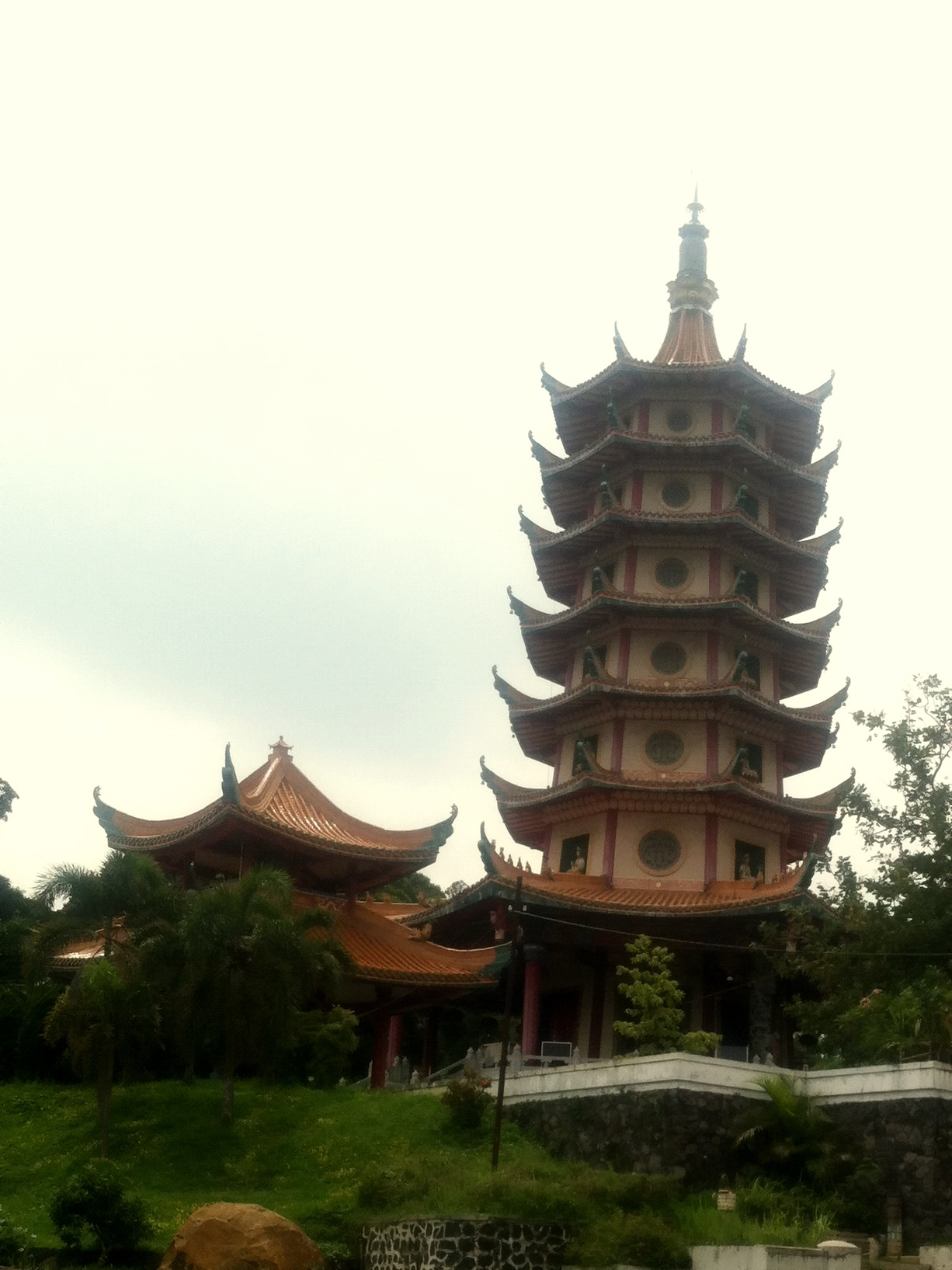
Pagoda Avalokitesvara also known as Pagoda Guanyin

Pagoda Avalokitesvara (Pagoda Guanyin) is on the main path of the complex. Construction started in August 2004 and opened by July 14, 2005. This building is the tallest pagoda tower in Indonesia at 45 meters. The architecture follows the design of the main temple and represents Metta Karuna or love of Buddha.

The building used concrete for the structure and brick for the walls. The outer layer is painted in red to represent happiness or luck. This tower has seven levels with thirty statues of worship inside and a five-meter Avalokitesvara Boddhisatva statue surrounded by fruits and flowers as worship offerings.

Outside the perimeter of the pagoda are five Guanyin statues and one of We Po. The building has eight sides and is called Pat Kwa.

== Watugong ==
The name Watugong derives from a natural rock formation with a gong-like shape, thus the name watu or rock and gong. This rock is unique because it naturally formed into a gong-like shape.

== Bodh Gaya Foundation ==
The Bodh Gaya Foundation was established on October 19, 1955, to manage the day-to-day operations of the complex, and is responsible for maintenance and preservation.

== See also ==
- Lord Buddha
- Ashin Jinarakkhita
- Narada Maha Thera
- Buddhism in Indonesia
