= Nanshan Temple (Zhangzhou) =

Buddhist temple in Zhangzhou, Fujian, China

- 南山寺
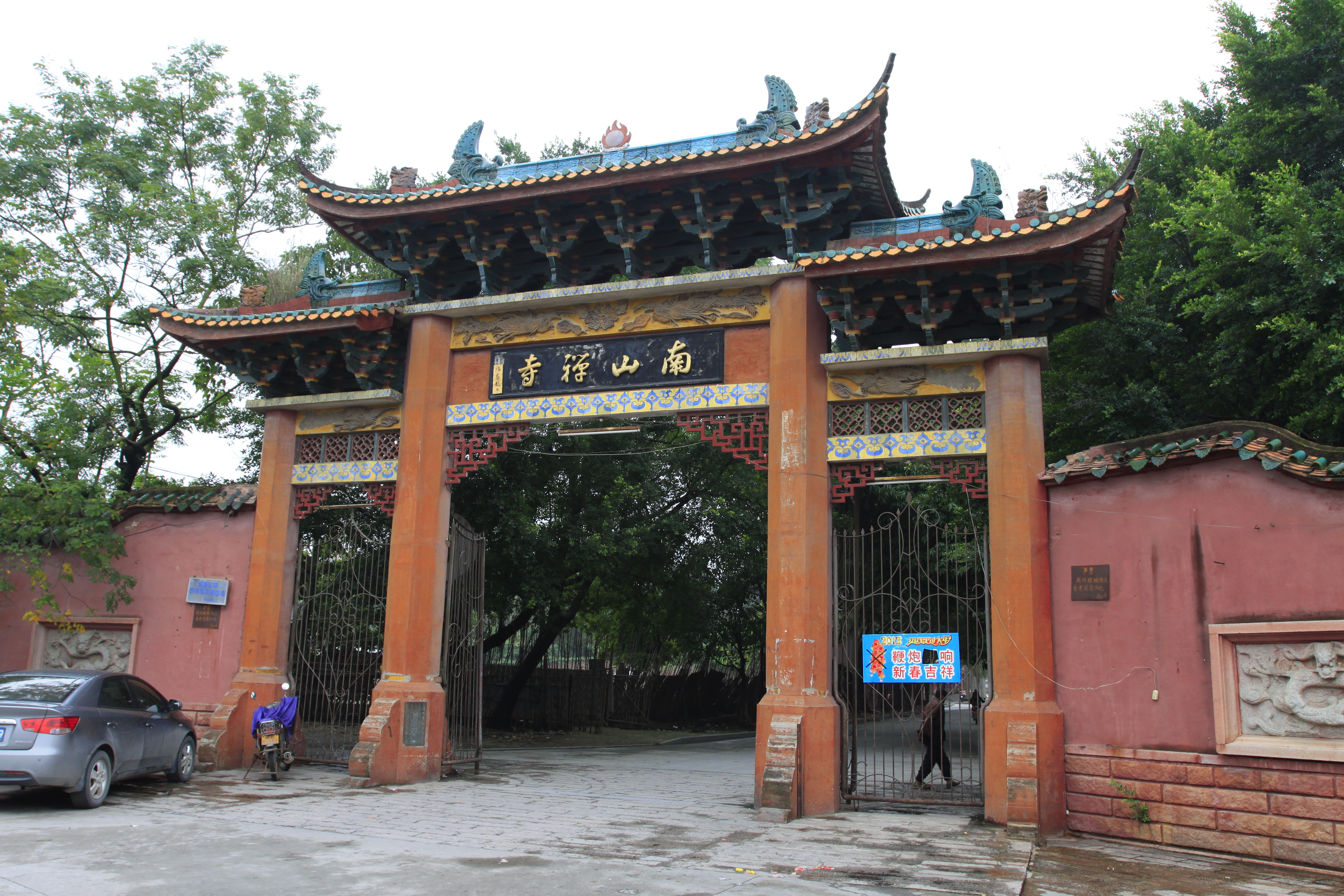
- Nanshan Temple

- Location within Fujian

Religion
- Affiliation: Buddhism
- Sect: Chan Buddhism

Location
- Coordinates: 24°30′00″N 117°38′30″E

Architecture
- Style: Chinese architecture
- Founder: Chen Yong (陈邕)
- Established: 713–714

Nanshan Temple (Chinese: 南山寺; pinyin: Nánshān Sì; Pe̍h-ōe-jī: Lâm-soaⁿ-sī) is a Buddhist temple in the foothills of Mount Danxia (丹霞山) to the south of Zhangzhou City, Fujian Province, People's Republic of China. It is one of the most important Chinese Buddhism temples in China.

== History ==
Originally known as the Baoqu Institute (報劬院), the temple was built during the reign of Emperor Xuanzong of Tang during his Kaiyuan era (開元) and completed in 736 CE. In 968 CE during the reign of Emperor Taizu of Song it was repaired by the provincial governor Chen Wen (陈文) and renamed Chongfu Temple (崇福寺). Later on during the Ming dynasty, its name changed once more to the current "Nanshan Temple".

== Description ==
Nanshan Temple is built in the typical style with the central axis divided into the Hall of the Four Heavenly Kings (天王殿), the Mahavira Hall (大雄寳殿) and a the Monasterial Library for the storage of sacred Buddhist scriptures. Within this library there is a large stone Buddha as well as a white jade one that was brought from Myanmar during the Qing dynasty (1644–1911), a large clock and a Ming dynasty (1368–1644) Avatamsaka Sutra. Together with a sutra written on palm leaves by the Qing Guangxu Emperor, these items are known as the "Five Treasures of Nanshan" (南山寺五寶).

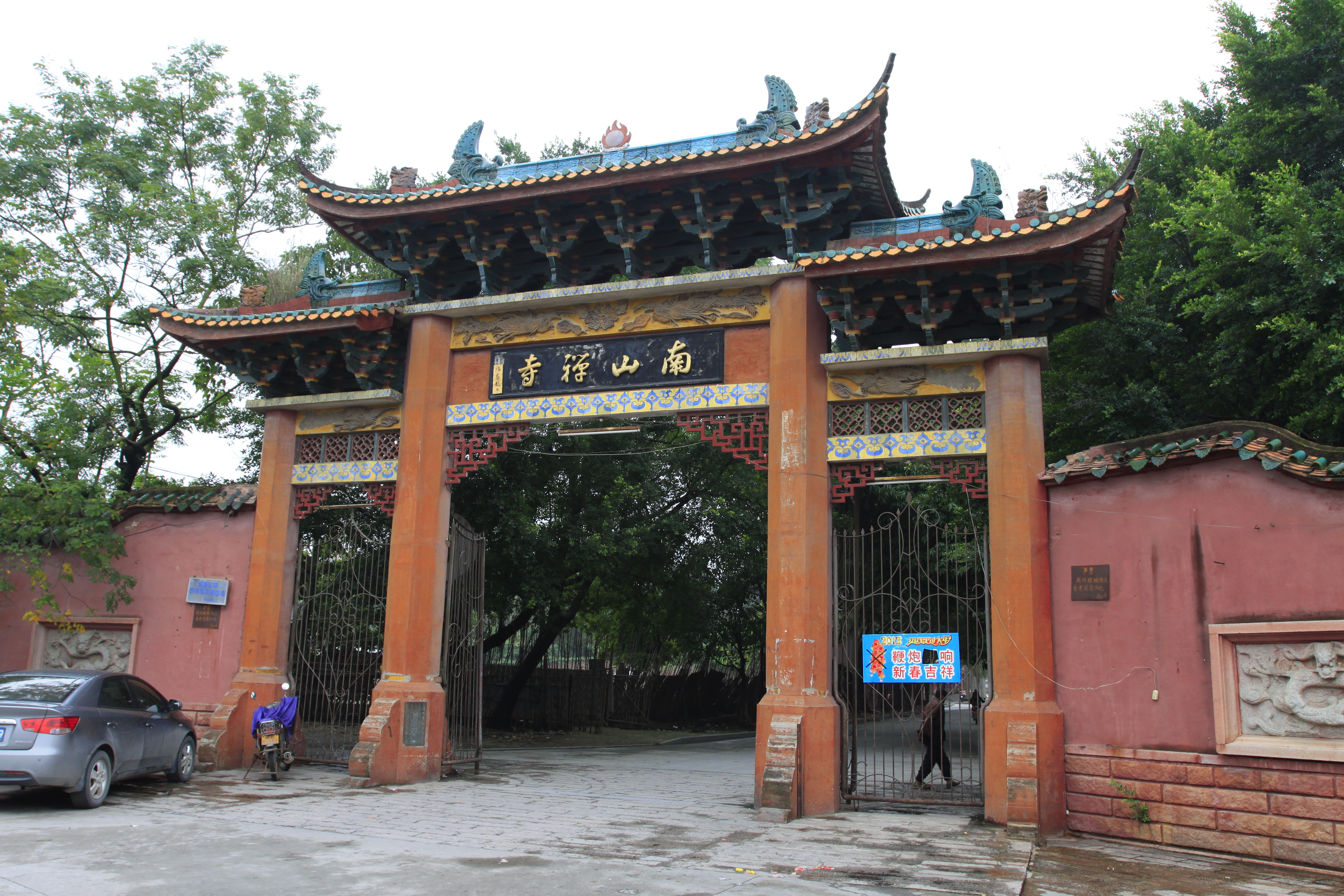

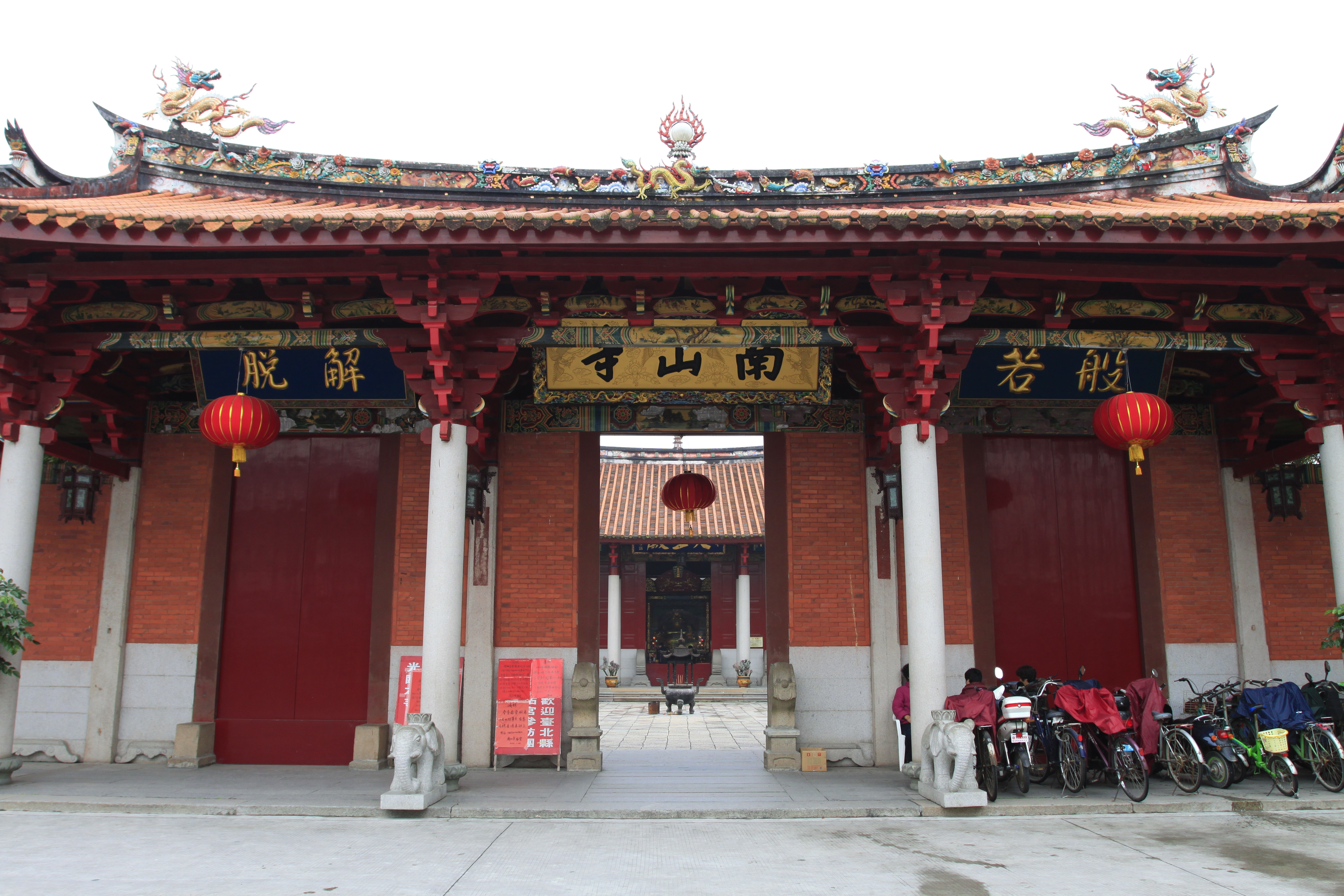

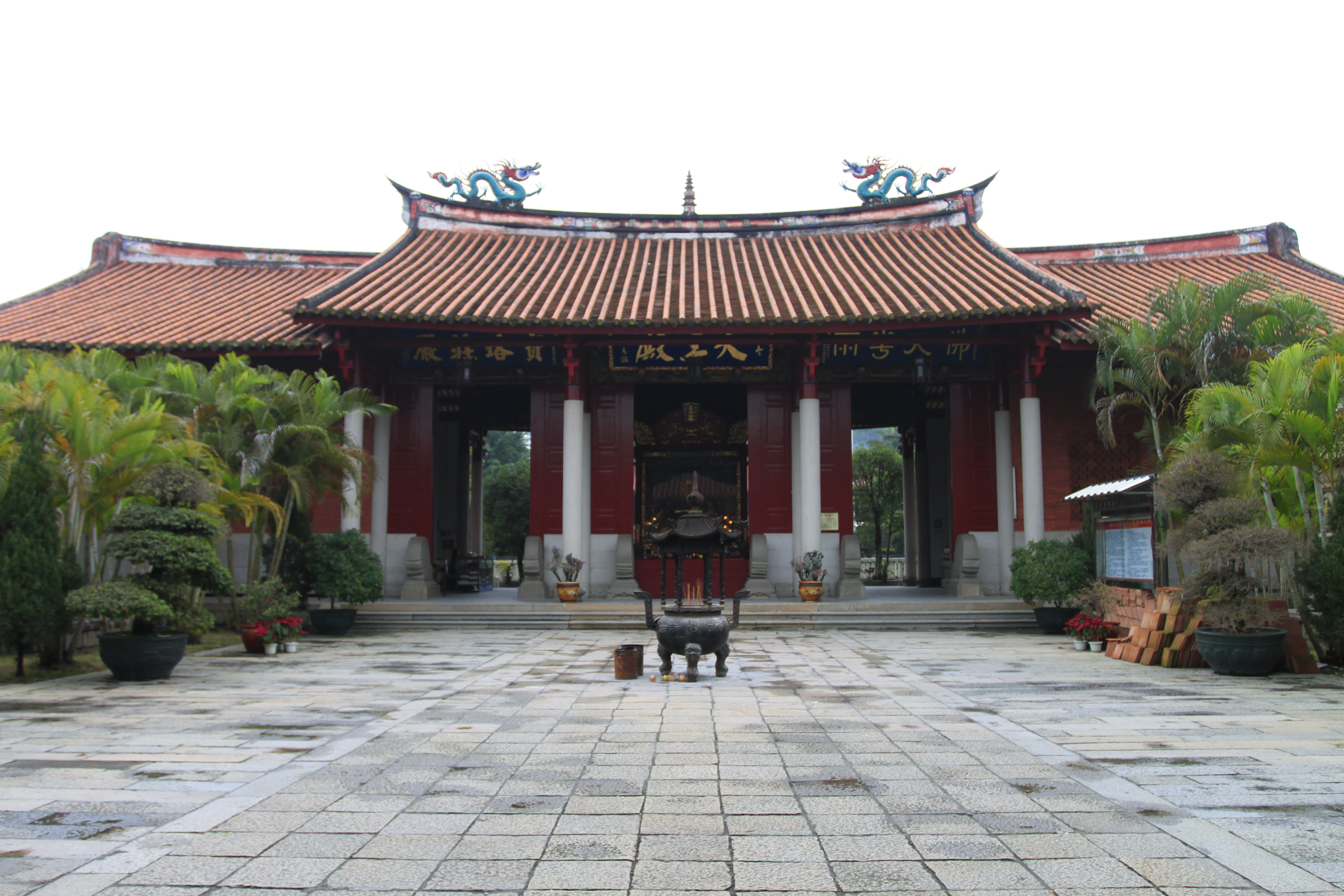
Hall of the Four Heavenly Kings

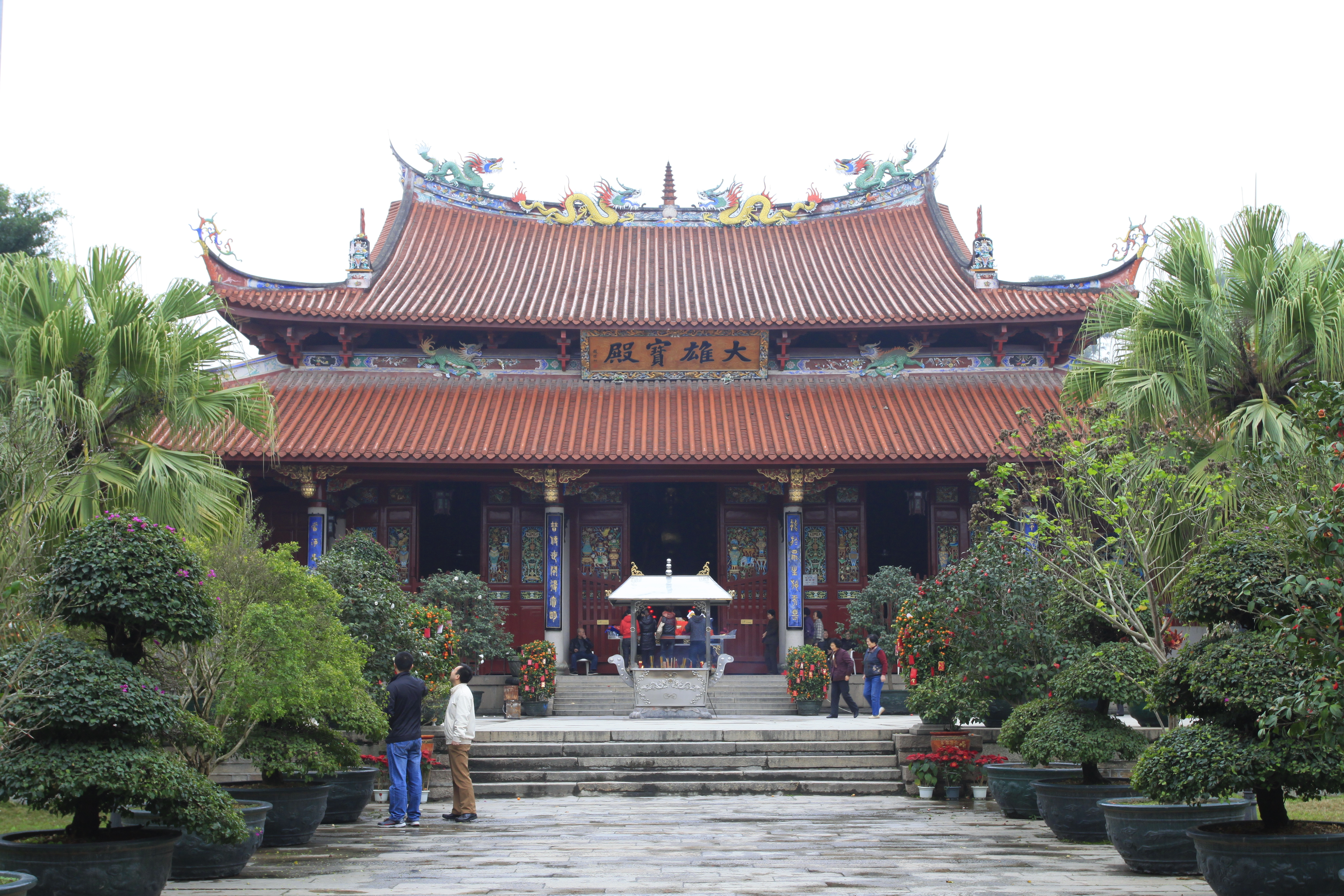
Mahavira Hall

== See also ==
- Guanghua Temple
