= Parwati Soepangat =

Indonesian Buddhist figure

Maha Upasaka Pandita Metta Pannakusuma Parwati Soepangat
- Born: Parwati Soepangat; May 1, 1932; Surakarta, Central Java, Dutch East Indies
- Died: July 24, 2016 (aged 84); Jakarta, Indonesia
- Occupation: Professor
- Known for: Buddhist feminism

Parwati Soepangat (1 May 1932 – 24 July 2016), also known as Maha Upasaka Pandita Metta Pannakusuma Parwati Soepangat Soemarto, was an Indonesian Buddhist leader who established Wanita Buddhis Indonesia (WBI) in 1973 and became the first chairman of WBI.

== Early life ==
Parwati was born in Keraton Surakarta from Kanjeng Raden Tumenggung (KRT) Widyonagoro, Regent of Keraton and Raden Ajeng Soewiyah, a teacher in Sekolah Keraton.

In 1958, she graduated from Gajah Mada University. Parwati continued her studies in United States. She received a Masters in Educational Psychology at the Vanderbilt Peabody College of Education and Human Development.

== Academic career ==
Back to Indonesia, Parwati became a lecturer in Faculty of Psychology in Padjadjaran University and Maranatha Christian University, which located in Bandung. She received her PhD in Psychology in Padjadjaran University and remained there since.
