= Qielan Hall =

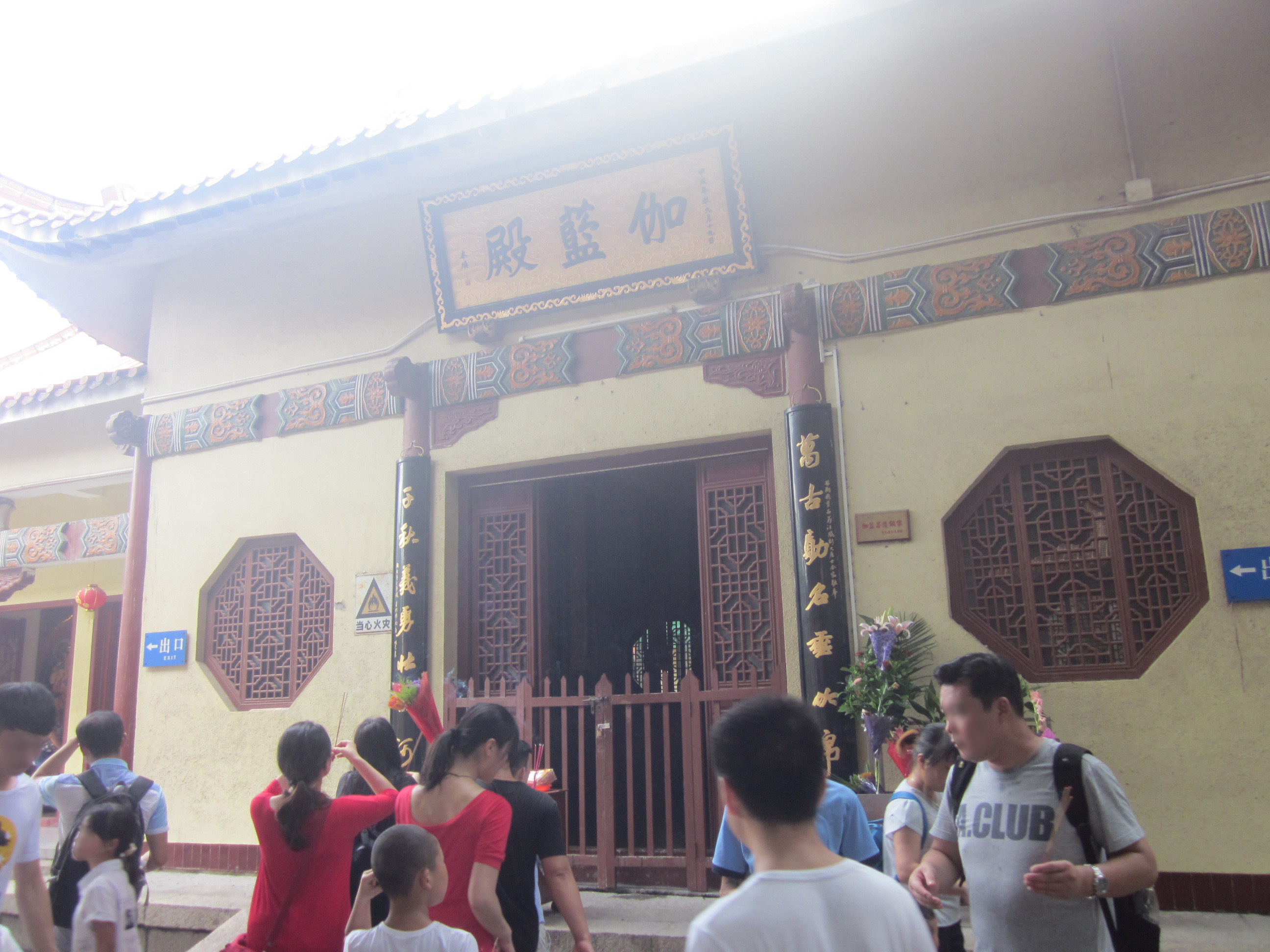
- The Hall of Sangharama Palace at Hongfa Temple, in Shenzhen, Guangdong, China.
- Traditional Chinese: 伽藍殿
- Simplified Chinese: 伽蓝殿
Transcriptions
Standard Mandarin
- Hanyu Pinyin: Qiélándiàn

The Qielan Hall (simplified Chinese: 伽蓝殿; traditional Chinese: 伽藍殿; pinyin: Qiélándiàn; lit. 'Hall of Sangharama Palace') is an important building in Han Chinese Buddhist temples. It is the east annex hall of the Daxiongbao Hall. The term "Sangharama" (僧伽藍摩) refers to "gardens of monks" (眾園). In Buddhism, it originally refers to constructing the base of monks' dormitories (僧舍) and later it refers to the general term of temples, including both land and buildings.

== Description ==
=== Ancient India ===
In the Qielan Hall, King Pasenadi, Prince Jeta and Anathapindika are enshrined. They created the grand Jetavana Vihara (祇園精舍) for the Buddha to live and preach, which was a significant contribution to the creation and spread of Buddhism. So they were regarded as Sangharama deities, namely the guardians of the land where Buddhism is rooted.

=== China ===
In Chinese Buddhism, general Guan Yu in the Three Kingdoms period (220–280) is often enshrined in the Qielan Hall based on a legend pertaining to Yuquan Temple.

During the Sui dynasty (581–618), when the founder of the Tiantai school, Master Zhiyi was in Yuquan Mountain in Jingzhou, Hubei, and witnessed the presence of many strange monsters. Then afterwards, a deity with a long beard who claimed to be Guan Yu appeared and talked to him. Zhiyi preached the Buddha's Dharma to Guan Yu, which moved him and he finally devoted himself to Buddhism and became a dharmapala for Buddha.

Including Guan Yu as one of the dharmapalas in Buddhism promoted the spread of Buddhism in China.
