= List of Majjhima Nikaya suttas =

This is a list of the suttas in the Majjhima Nikaya collection of middle-length discourses, part of the Tipiṭaka Buddhist Canon. English translations were done by Bhante Sujato.

== General list ==
Sutta No.	Parts	Divisions	Pali Title	English Title
Sutta No.	Parts	Divisions	Description	
MN 1	Mūlapannāsapāli - The Root Fifty Discourses	Mūlapariyāya Vagga - The Division of the Discourse on the Root	Mulapariyaya Sutta	The Root Sequence
MN 1	Mūlapannāsapāli - The Root Fifty Discourses	Mūlapariyāya Vagga - The Division of the Discourse on the Root	The Buddha examines how the notion of a permanent self emerges from the process of perception. A wide range of phenomena are considered, embracing both naturalistic and cosmological dimensions. An unawakened person interprets experience in terms of a self, while those more advanced have the same experiences without attachment.	
MN 2	Mūlapannāsapāli - The Root Fifty Discourses	Mūlapariyāya Vagga - The Division of the Discourse on the Root	Sabbasava Sutta	All the Fermentations
MN 2	Mūlapannāsapāli - The Root Fifty Discourses	Mūlapariyāya Vagga - The Division of the Discourse on the Root	Also called "All The Taints" (Bhikkhu Bodhi) This sutta explains the seven ways to remove the taints by seeing, restraining, using, enduing, avoiding, removing, and by developing.	
MN 3	Mūlapannāsapāli - The Root Fifty Discourses	Mūlapariyāya Vagga - The Division of the Discourse on the Root	Dhammadayada Sutta	Heirs in Dhamma
MN 3	Mūlapannāsapāli - The Root Fifty Discourses	Mūlapariyāya Vagga - The Division of the Discourse on the Root	Some of the Buddha’s students inherit from him only material profits and fame. But his true inheritance is the spiritual path, the way of contentment. Venerable Sāriputta explains how by following the Buddha’s example we can experience the fruits of the path.	
MN 4	Mūlapannāsapāli - The Root Fifty Discourses	Mūlapariyāya Vagga - The Division of the Discourse on the Root	Bhaya-bherava Sutta	Fear and Terror
MN 4	Mūlapannāsapāli - The Root Fifty Discourses	Mūlapariyāya Vagga - The Division of the Discourse on the Root	The Buddha explains the difficulties of living in the wilderness, and how they are overcome by purity of conduct and meditation. He recounts some of the fears and obstacles he faced during his own practice.	
MN 5	Mūlapannāsapāli - The Root Fifty Discourses	Mūlapariyāya Vagga - The Division of the Discourse on the Root	Anangana Sutta	Without Blemishes
MN 5	Mūlapannāsapāli - The Root Fifty Discourses	Mūlapariyāya Vagga - The Division of the Discourse on the Root	The Buddha’s chief disciples, Sāriputta and Moggallāna, use a simile of a tarnished bowl to illustrate the blemishes of the mind and conduct. They emphasize how the crucial thing is not so much whether there are blemishes, but whether we are aware of them.	
MN 6	Mūlapannāsapāli - The Root Fifty Discourses	Mūlapariyāya Vagga - The Division of the Discourse on the Root	Akankheyya Sutta	If a Bhikkhu Should Wish
MN 6	Mūlapannāsapāli - The Root Fifty Discourses	Mūlapariyāya Vagga - The Division of the Discourse on the Root	According to the Buddha, careful observance of ethical precepts is the foundation of all higher achievements in the spiritual life.	
MN 7	Mūlapannāsapāli - The Root Fifty Discourses	Mūlapariyāya Vagga - The Division of the Discourse on the Root	Vatthupama Sutta	The Simile of the Cloth
MN 7	Mūlapannāsapāli - The Root Fifty Discourses	Mūlapariyāya Vagga - The Division of the Discourse on the Root	The many different kinds of impurities that defile the mind are compared to a dirty cloth. When the mind is clean we find joy, which leads to states of higher consciousness. Finally, the Buddha rejects the Brahmanical notion that purity comes from bathing in sacred rivers.	
MN 8	Mūlapannāsapāli - The Root Fifty Discourses	Mūlapariyāya Vagga - The Division of the Discourse on the Root	Sallekha Sutta	The Discourse on Effacement
MN 8	Mūlapannāsapāli - The Root Fifty Discourses	Mūlapariyāya Vagga - The Division of the Discourse on the Root	The Buddha differentiates between peaceful meditation and spiritual practices that encompass the whole of life. He lists forty-four aspects, which he explains as “effacement”, the wearing away of conceit.	
MN 9	Mūlapannāsapāli - The Root Fifty Discourses	Mūlapariyāya Vagga - The Division of the Discourse on the Root	Sammaditthi Sutta	Right View
MN 9	Mūlapannāsapāli - The Root Fifty Discourses	Mūlapariyāya Vagga - The Division of the Discourse on the Root	Venerable Sāriputta gives a detailed explanation of right view, the first factor of the noble eightfold path. At the prompting of the other mendicants, he approaches the topic from a wide range of perspectives.	
MN 10	Mūlapannāsapāli - The Root Fifty Discourses	Mūlapariyāya Vagga - The Division of the Discourse on the Root	Satipatthana Sutta	Frames of Reference/Foundations of Mindfulness
MN 10	Mūlapannāsapāli - The Root Fifty Discourses	Mūlapariyāya Vagga - The Division of the Discourse on the Root	Here the Buddha details the seventh factor of the noble eightfold path, mindfulness meditation. This collects many of the meditation teachings found throughout the canon, especially the foundational practices focusing on the body, and is regarded as one of the most important meditation discourses.	
MN 11	Mūlapannāsapāli - The Root Fifty Discourses	Sīhanāda Vagga - The Division of the Lion's Roar	Cula-sihanada Sutta	The Shorter Discourse on the Lion's Roar
MN 11	Mūlapannāsapāli - The Root Fifty Discourses	Sīhanāda Vagga - The Division of the Lion's Roar	The Buddha declares that only those following his path can genuinely experience the four stages of awakening. This is because, while much is shared with other systems, none of them go so far as to fully reject all attachment to the idea of a self.	
MN 12	Mūlapannāsapāli - The Root Fifty Discourses	Sīhanāda Vagga - The Division of the Lion's Roar	Maha-sihanada Sutta	The Great Discourse on the Lion's Roar
MN 12	Mūlapannāsapāli - The Root Fifty Discourses	Sīhanāda Vagga - The Division of the Lion's Roar	A disrobed monk, Sunakkhatta, attacks the Buddha’s teaching because it merely leads to the end of suffering. The Buddha counters that this is, in fact, praise, and goes on to enumerate his many profound and powerful achievements.	
MN 13	Mūlapannāsapāli - The Root Fifty Discourses	Sīhanāda Vagga - The Division of the Lion's Roar	Maha-dukkhakkhandha Sutta	The Greater Discourse on the Mass of Suffering
MN 13	Mūlapannāsapāli - The Root Fifty Discourses	Sīhanāda Vagga - The Division of the Lion's Roar	Challenged to show the difference between his teaching and that of other ascetics, the Buddha points out that they speak of letting go, but do not really understand why. He then explains in great detail the suffering that arises from attachment to sensual stimulation.	
MN 14	Mūlapannāsapāli - The Root Fifty Discourses	Sīhanāda Vagga - The Division of the Lion's Roar	Cula-dukkhakkhandha Sutta	The Shorter Discourse on the Mass of Suffering
MN 14	Mūlapannāsapāli - The Root Fifty Discourses	Sīhanāda Vagga - The Division of the Lion's Roar	A lay person is puzzled at how, despite their long practice, they still have greedy or hateful thoughts. The Buddha explains the importance of absorption meditation for letting go such attachments. But he also criticizes self-mortification, and recounts a previous dialog with Jain ascetics.	
MN 15	Mūlapannāsapāli - The Root Fifty Discourses	Sīhanāda Vagga - The Division of the Lion's Roar	Anumana Sutta	Inference
MN 15	Mūlapannāsapāli - The Root Fifty Discourses	Sīhanāda Vagga - The Division of the Lion's Roar	Venerable Moggallāna raises the topic of admonishment, without which healthy community is not possible. He lists a number of qualities that will encourage others to think it worthwhile to admonish you in a constructive way.	
MN 16	Mūlapannāsapāli - The Root Fifty Discourses	Sīhanāda Vagga - The Division of the Lion's Roar	Cetokhila Sutta	The Wilderness in the Heart
MN 16	Mūlapannāsapāli - The Root Fifty Discourses	Sīhanāda Vagga - The Division of the Lion's Roar	The Buddha explains various ways one can become emotionally cut off from one’s spiritual community.	
MN 17	Mūlapannāsapāli - The Root Fifty Discourses	Sīhanāda Vagga - The Division of the Lion's Roar	Vanapattha Sutta	Jungle Thickets
MN 17	Mūlapannāsapāli - The Root Fifty Discourses	Sīhanāda Vagga - The Division of the Lion's Roar	While living in the wilderness is great, not everyone is ready for it. The Buddha encourages meditators to reflect on whether one’s environment is genuinely supporting their meditation practice, and if not, to leave.	
MN 18	Mūlapannāsapāli - The Root Fifty Discourses	Sīhanāda Vagga - The Division of the Lion's Roar	Madhupindika Sutta	The Ball of Honey
MN 18	Mūlapannāsapāli - The Root Fifty Discourses	Sīhanāda Vagga - The Division of the Lion's Roar	Challenged by a brahmin, the Buddha gives an enigmatic response on how conflict arises due to proliferation based on perceptions. Venerable Kaccāna draws out the detailed implications of this in one of the most insightful passages in the entire canon.	
MN 19	Mūlapannāsapāli - The Root Fifty Discourses	Sīhanāda Vagga - The Division of the Lion's Roar	Dvedhavitakka Sutta	Two Sorts of Thinking
MN 19	Mūlapannāsapāli - The Root Fifty Discourses	Sīhanāda Vagga - The Division of the Lion's Roar	Recounting his own experiences in developing meditation, the Buddha explains how to understand harmful and harmless thoughts, and how to go beyond thought altogether.	
MN 20	Mūlapannāsapāli - The Root Fifty Discourses	Sīhanāda Vagga - The Division of the Lion's Roar	Vitakkasanthana Sutta	The Removal of Distracting Thoughts
MN 20	Mūlapannāsapāli - The Root Fifty Discourses	Sīhanāda Vagga - The Division of the Lion's Roar	In a practical meditation teaching, the Buddha describes five different approaches to stopping thoughts.	
MN 21	Mūlapannāsapāli - The Root Fifty Discourses	Opamma Vagga - The Division of Similes	Kakacupama Sutta	The Simile of the Saw
MN 21	Mūlapannāsapāli - The Root Fifty Discourses	Opamma Vagga - The Division of Similes	A discourse full of vibrant and memorable similes, on the importance of patience and love even when faced with abuse and criticism. The Buddha finishes with the simile of the saw, one of the most memorable similes found in the discourses.	
MN 22	Mūlapannāsapāli - The Root Fifty Discourses	Opamma Vagga - The Division of Similes	Alagaddupama Sutta	The Water-Snake Simile
MN 22	Mūlapannāsapāli - The Root Fifty Discourses	Opamma Vagga - The Division of Similes	One of the monks denies that prohibited conduct is really a problem. The monks and then the Buddha subject him to an impressive dressing down. The Buddha compares someone who understands only the letter of the teachings to someone who grabs a snake by the tail, and also invokes the famous simile of the raft.	
MN 23	Mūlapannāsapāli - The Root Fifty Discourses	Opamma Vagga - The Division of Similes	Vammika Sutta	The Ant
MN 23	Mūlapannāsapāli - The Root Fifty Discourses	Opamma Vagga - The Division of Similes	In a curious discourse laden with evocative imagery, a deity presents a riddle to a mendicant, who seeks an answer from the Buddha.	
MN 24	Mūlapannāsapāli - The Root Fifty Discourses	Opamma Vagga - The Division of Similes	Ratha-vinita Sutta	Relay Chariots
MN 24	Mūlapannāsapāli - The Root Fifty Discourses	Opamma Vagga - The Division of Similes	Venerable Sāriputta seeks a dialog with an esteemed monk, Venerable Puṇṇa Mantāniputta, and they discuss the stages of purification.	
MN 25	Mūlapannāsapāli - The Root Fifty Discourses	Opamma Vagga - The Division of Similes	Nivapa Sutta	The Bait
MN 25	Mūlapannāsapāli - The Root Fifty Discourses	Opamma Vagga - The Division of Similes	The Buddha compares getting trapped by Māra with a deer getting caught in a snare, illustrating the ever more complex strategies employed by hunter and hunted.	
MN 26	Mūlapannāsapāli - The Root Fifty Discourses	Opamma Vagga - The Division of Similes	Ariyapariyesana Sutta	The Noble Search
MN 26	Mūlapannāsapāli - The Root Fifty Discourses	Opamma Vagga - The Division of Similes	This is one of the most important biographical discourses, telling the Buddha’s experiences from leaving home to realizing awakening. Throughout, he was driven by the imperative to fully escape from rebirth and suffering.	
MN 27	Mūlapannāsapāli - The Root Fifty Discourses	Opamma Vagga - The Division of Similes	Cula-hatthipadopama Sutta	The Shorter Elephant Footprint Simile
MN 27	Mūlapannāsapāli - The Root Fifty Discourses	Opamma Vagga - The Division of Similes	The Buddha cautions against swift conclusions about a teacher’s spiritual accomplishments, comparing it to the care a tracker would use when tracking elephants. He presents the full training of a monastic.	
MN 28	Mūlapannāsapāli - The Root Fifty Discourses	Opamma Vagga - The Division of Similes	Maha-hatthipadopama Sutta	The Great Elephant Footprint Simile
MN 28	Mūlapannāsapāli - The Root Fifty Discourses	Opamma Vagga - The Division of Similes	Sāriputta gives an elaborate demonstration of how, just as any footprint can fit inside an elephant’s, all the Buddha’s teaching can fit inside the four noble truths. This offers an overall template for organizing the Buddha’s teachings.	
MN 29	Mūlapannāsapāli - The Root Fifty Discourses	Opamma Vagga - The Division of Similes	Maha-saropama Sutta	The Greater Discourse on the Simile of the Heartwood
MN 29	Mūlapannāsapāli - The Root Fifty Discourses	Opamma Vagga - The Division of Similes	Following the incident with Devadatta, the Buddha cautions the mendicants against becoming complacent with superficial benefits of spiritual life and points to liberation as the true heart of the teaching.	
MN 30	Mūlapannāsapāli - The Root Fifty Discourses	Opamma Vagga - The Division of Similes	Cula-saropama Sutta	The Shorter Discourse on the Simile of the Heartwood
MN 30	Mūlapannāsapāli - The Root Fifty Discourses	Opamma Vagga - The Division of Similes	Similar to the previous. After the incident with Devadatta, the Buddha cautions the mendicants against becoming complacent and points to liberation as the true heart of the teaching.	
MN 31	Mūlapannāsapāli - The Root Fifty Discourses	Mahāyamaka Vagga - The Great Division of Pairs	Cula-gosinga Sutta	The Shorter Discourse in Gosinga
MN 31	Mūlapannāsapāli - The Root Fifty Discourses	Mahāyamaka Vagga - The Great Division of Pairs	The Buddha comes across three mendicants practicing diligently and harmoniously, and asks them how they do it. Reluctant to disclose their higher attainments, they explain how they deal with the practical affairs of living together. But when pressed by the Buddha, they reveal their meditation attainments.	
MN 32	Mūlapannāsapāli - The Root Fifty Discourses	Mahāyamaka Vagga - The Great Division of Pairs	Maha-gosinga Sutta	The Greater Discourse in Gosinga
MN 32	Mūlapannāsapāli - The Root Fifty Discourses	Mahāyamaka Vagga - The Great Division of Pairs	Several senior mendicants, reveling in the beauty of the night, discuss what kind of practitioner would adorn the park. They take their answers to the Buddha, who praises their answers, but gives his own twist.	
MN 33	Mūlapannāsapāli - The Root Fifty Discourses	Mahāyamaka Vagga - The Great Division of Pairs	Maha-gopalaka Sutta	The Greater Cowherd Discourse
MN 33	Mūlapannāsapāli - The Root Fifty Discourses	Mahāyamaka Vagga - The Great Division of Pairs	This sutta explains the eleven ways for a bhikkhu to make progress in the path.	
MN 34	Mūlapannāsapāli - The Root Fifty Discourses	Mahāyamaka Vagga - The Great Division of Pairs	Cula-gopalaka Sutta	The Shorter Discourse on the Cowherd
MN 34	Mūlapannāsapāli - The Root Fifty Discourses	Mahāyamaka Vagga - The Great Division of Pairs	Drawing parallels with a cowherd guiding his herd across a dangerous river, the Buddha presents the various kinds of enlightened disciples who cross the stream of transmigration.	
MN 35	Mūlapannāsapāli - The Root Fifty Discourses	Mahāyamaka Vagga - The Great Division of Pairs	Cula-saccaka Sutta	The Shorter Discourse on the Saccaka
MN 35	Mūlapannāsapāli - The Root Fifty Discourses	Mahāyamaka Vagga - The Great Division of Pairs	Saccaka was a debater, who challenged the Buddha to a contest. Despite his bragging, the Buddha is not at all perturbed at his attacks.	
MN 36	Mūlapannāsapāli - The Root Fifty Discourses	Mahāyamaka Vagga - The Great Division of Pairs	Maha-Saccaka Sutta	The Greater Discourse on the Saccaka
MN 36	Mūlapannāsapāli - The Root Fifty Discourses	Mahāyamaka Vagga - The Great Division of Pairs	In a less confrontational meeting, the Buddha and Saccaka discuss the difference between physical and mental development. The Buddha gives a long account of the various practices he did before awakening, detailing the astonishing lengths he took to mortify the body.	
MN 37	Mūlapannāsapāli - The Root Fifty Discourses	Mahāyamaka Vagga - The Great Division of Pairs	Cula-tanhasankhaya Sutta	The Shorter Discourse on the Destruction of Craving
MN 37	Mūlapannāsapāli - The Root Fifty Discourses	Mahāyamaka Vagga - The Great Division of Pairs	Moggallāna visits the heaven of Sakka, the lord of gods, to see whether he really understands what the Buddha is teaching.	
MN 38	Mūlapannāsapāli - The Root Fifty Discourses	Mahāyamaka Vagga - The Great Division of Pairs	Maha-tanhasankhaya Sutta	The Greater Discourse on the Destruction of Craving
MN 38	Mūlapannāsapāli - The Root Fifty Discourses	Mahāyamaka Vagga - The Great Division of Pairs	To counter the wrong view that a self-identical consciousness transmigrates from one life to the next, the Buddha teaches dependent origination, showing that consciousness invariably arises dependent on conditions.	
MN 39	Mūlapannāsapāli - The Root Fifty Discourses	Mahāyamaka Vagga - The Great Division of Pairs	Maha-Assapura Sutta	The Greater Discourse at Assapura
MN 39	Mūlapannāsapāli - The Root Fifty Discourses	Mahāyamaka Vagga - The Great Division of Pairs	The Buddha encourages the mendicants to live up to their name, by actually practicing in a way that meets or exceeds the expectations people have for renunciants.	
MN 40	Mūlapannāsapāli - The Root Fifty Discourses	Mahāyamaka Vagga - The Great Division of Pairs	Cula-assapura Sutta	The Shorter Discourse at Assapura
MN 40	Mūlapannāsapāli - The Root Fifty Discourses	Mahāyamaka Vagga - The Great Division of Pairs	The labels of being a spiritual practitioner don’t just come from external trappings, but from sincere inner change.	
MN 41	Mūlapannāsapāli - The Root Fifty Discourses	Cūḷayamaka Vagga - The Shorter Division of Pairs	Saleyyaka Sutta	The Brahmans of Sala
MN 41	Mūlapannāsapāli - The Root Fifty Discourses	Cūḷayamaka Vagga - The Shorter Division of Pairs	The Buddha explains to a group of brahmins the conduct leading to rebirth in higher or lower states, including detailed explanations of the ten core practices which lay people should undertake, and which also form the basis for liberation.	
MN 42	Mūlapannāsapāli - The Root Fifty Discourses	Cūḷayamaka Vagga - The Shorter Division of Pairs	Veranjaka Sutta	The Brahmins of Veranjaka
MN 42	Mūlapannāsapāli - The Root Fifty Discourses	Cūḷayamaka Vagga - The Shorter Division of Pairs	Similar to the previous. The Buddha explains the conduct leading to rebirth in higher or lower states, including detailed explanations of the ten core practices.	
MN 43	Mūlapannāsapāli - The Root Fifty Discourses	Cūḷayamaka Vagga - The Shorter Division of Pairs	Maha-vedalla Sutta	The Greater Set of Questions-and-Answers
MN 43	Mūlapannāsapāli - The Root Fifty Discourses	Cūḷayamaka Vagga - The Shorter Division of Pairs	A series of questions and answers between Sāriputta and Mahākoṭṭhita, examining various subtle and abstruse aspects of the teachings.	
MN 44	Mūlapannāsapāli - The Root Fifty Discourses	Cūḷayamaka Vagga - The Shorter Division of Pairs	Cula-vedalla Sutta	The Shorter Set of Questions-and-Answers
MN 44	Mūlapannāsapāli - The Root Fifty Discourses	Cūḷayamaka Vagga - The Shorter Division of Pairs	The layman Visākha asks the nun Dhammadinnā about various difficult matters, including some of the highest meditation attainments. The Buddha fully endorses her answers.	
MN 45	Mūlapannāsapāli - The Root Fifty Discourses	Cūḷayamaka Vagga - The Shorter Division of Pairs	Cula-dhammasamadana Sutta	The Shorter Discourse on Taking on Practices
MN 45	Mūlapannāsapāli - The Root Fifty Discourses	Cūḷayamaka Vagga - The Shorter Division of Pairs	The Buddha explains how taking up different practices may have harmful or beneficial results. The memorable simile of the creeper shows how insidious temptations can be.	
MN 46	Mūlapannāsapāli - The Root Fifty Discourses	Cūḷayamaka Vagga - The Shorter Division of Pairs	Maha-dhammasamadana Sutta	The Greater Discourse on Taking on Practices
MN 46	Mūlapannāsapāli - The Root Fifty Discourses	Cūḷayamaka Vagga - The Shorter Division of Pairs	While we all want to be happy, we often find the opposite happens. The Buddha explains why.	
MN 47	Mūlapannāsapāli - The Root Fifty Discourses	Cūḷayamaka Vagga - The Shorter Division of Pairs	Vīmaṃsaka Sutta	The Inquirer
MN 47	Mūlapannāsapāli - The Root Fifty Discourses	Cūḷayamaka Vagga - The Shorter Division of Pairs	While some spiritual teachers prefer to remain in obscurity, the Buddha not only encouraged his followers to closely investigate him, but gave them a detailed and demanding method to do so.	
MN 48	Mūlapannāsapāli - The Root Fifty Discourses	Cūḷayamaka Vagga - The Shorter Division of Pairs	Kosambiya Sutta	The Kosambians
MN 48	Mūlapannāsapāli - The Root Fifty Discourses	Cūḷayamaka Vagga - The Shorter Division of Pairs	Despite the Buddha’s presence, the monks of Kosambi fell into a deep and bitter dispute. The Buddha taught the reluctant monks to develop love and harmony, reminding them of the state of peace that they sought.	
MN 49	Mūlapannāsapāli - The Root Fifty Discourses	Cūḷayamaka Vagga - The Shorter Division of Pairs	Brahmanimantanika Sutta	The Invitation Of A Brahma
MN 49	Mūlapannāsapāli - The Root Fifty Discourses	Cūḷayamaka Vagga - The Shorter Division of Pairs	The Buddha ascends to a high heavenly realm where he engages in a cosmic contest with a powerful divinity, who had fallen into the delusion that he was eternal and all-powerful.	
MN 50	Mūlapannāsapāli - The Root Fifty Discourses	Cūḷayamaka Vagga - The Shorter Division of Pairs	Maratajjaniya Sutta	The Rebuke to Mara
MN 50	Mūlapannāsapāli - The Root Fifty Discourses	Cūḷayamaka Vagga - The Shorter Division of Pairs	Māra, the trickster and god of death, tried to annoy Moggallāna. He not only failed but was subject to a stern sermon warning of the dangers of attacking the Buddha’s disciples.	
MN 51	Majjhimapannāsapāli - The Middle Fifty Discourses	Gahapati Vagga - The Division on Householders	Kandaka Sutta	To Kandaka
MN 51	Majjhimapannāsapāli - The Middle Fifty Discourses	Gahapati Vagga - The Division on Householders	The Buddha discusses mindfulness meditation with lay practitioners. Contrasting the openness of animals with the duplicity of humans, he explains how to practice in a way that causes no harm to oneself or others.	
MN 52	Majjhimapannāsapāli - The Middle Fifty Discourses	Gahapati Vagga - The Division on Householders	Atthakanagara Sutta	To the Man from Atthakanagara
MN 52	Majjhimapannāsapāli - The Middle Fifty Discourses	Gahapati Vagga - The Division on Householders	Asked by a householder to teach a path to freedom, Venerable Ānanda explains no less than eleven meditative states that may serve as doors to the deathless.	
MN 53	Majjhimapannāsapāli - The Middle Fifty Discourses	Gahapati Vagga - The Division on Householders	Sekha-patipada Sutta	The Practice for One in Training
MN 53	Majjhimapannāsapāli - The Middle Fifty Discourses	Gahapati Vagga - The Division on Householders	The Buddha is invited by his family, the Sakyans of Kapilavatthu, to inaugurate a new community hall. He invites Venerable Ānanda to explain in detail the stages of spiritual practice for one in higher training.	
MN 54	Majjhimapannāsapāli - The Middle Fifty Discourses	Gahapati Vagga - The Division on Householders	Potaliya Sutta	To Potaliya
MN 54	Majjhimapannāsapāli - The Middle Fifty Discourses	Gahapati Vagga - The Division on Householders	When Potaliya got upset at being referred to as “householder”, the Buddha quizzed him as to the true nature of attachment and renunciation.	
MN 55	Majjhimapannāsapāli - The Middle Fifty Discourses	Gahapati Vagga - The Division on Householders	Jivaka Sutta	Discourse given to Jīvaka, the healer
MN 55	Majjhimapannāsapāli - The Middle Fifty Discourses	Gahapati Vagga - The Division on Householders	The Buddha’s personal doctor, Jīvaka, hears criticisms of the Buddha’s policy regarding eating meat, and asks him about it.	
MN 56	Majjhimapannāsapāli - The Middle Fifty Discourses	Gahapati Vagga - The Division on Householders	Upali Sutta	Discourse given to Upali the householder
MN 56	Majjhimapannāsapāli - The Middle Fifty Discourses	Gahapati Vagga - The Division on Householders	The Buddha disagrees with a Jain ascetic on the question of whether physical or mental deeds are more important. When he hears of this, the Jain disciple Upāli decides to visit the Buddha and refute him, and proceeds despite all warnings.	
MN 57	Majjhimapannāsapāli - The Middle Fifty Discourses	Gahapati Vagga - The Division on Householders	Kukkuravatika Sutta	The Dog-duty Ascetic
MN 57	Majjhimapannāsapāli - The Middle Fifty Discourses	Gahapati Vagga - The Division on Householders	Some ascetics in ancient India undertook extreme practices, such as a vow to behave like an ox or a dog. The Buddha meets two such individuals, and is reluctantly pressed to reveal the kammic outcomes of such practice.	
MN 58	Majjhimapannāsapāli - The Middle Fifty Discourses	Gahapati Vagga - The Division on Householders	Abhaya Sutta	To Prince Abhaya (On Right Speech)
MN 58	Majjhimapannāsapāli - The Middle Fifty Discourses	Gahapati Vagga - The Division on Householders	The leader of the Jains, Nigaṇṭha Nātaputta, gives his disciple Prince Abhaya a dilemma to pose to the Buddha, supposing that this will show his weakness. Things don’t go quite as planned.	
MN 59	Majjhimapannāsapāli - The Middle Fifty Discourses	Gahapati Vagga - The Division on Householders	Bahuvedaniya Sutta	The Many Kinds of Feeling
MN 59	Majjhimapannāsapāli - The Middle Fifty Discourses	Gahapati Vagga - The Division on Householders	The Buddha resolves a disagreement on the number of kinds of feelings that he taught, pointing out that different ways of teaching are appropriate in different contexts, and should not be a cause of disputes. He goes on to show the importance of pleasure in developing higher meditation.	
MN 60	Majjhimapannāsapāli - The Middle Fifty Discourses	Gahapati Vagga - The Division on Householders	Apannaka Sutta	The Incontrovertible Teaching
MN 60	Majjhimapannāsapāli - The Middle Fifty Discourses	Gahapati Vagga - The Division on Householders	The Buddha teaches a group of uncommitted householders how to use a rational reflection to arrive at practices and principles that are guaranteed to have a good outcome, even if we don’t know all the variables.	
MN 61	Majjhimapannāsapāli - The Middle Fifty Discourses	Bhikkhu Vagga - The Division on Bhikkhus	Ambalatthikarahulovada Sutta	Advice to Rahula at Mango Stone
MN 61	Majjhimapannāsapāli - The Middle Fifty Discourses	Bhikkhu Vagga - The Division on Bhikkhus	Using the “object lesson” of a cup of water, the Buddha explains to his son, Rāhula, the importance of telling the truth and reflecting on one’s motives.	
MN 62	Majjhimapannāsapāli - The Middle Fifty Discourses	Bhikkhu Vagga - The Division on Bhikkhus	Maha-Rahulovada Sutta	The Greater Discourse of Advice to Rahula
MN 62	Majjhimapannāsapāli - The Middle Fifty Discourses	Bhikkhu Vagga - The Division on Bhikkhus	The Buddha tells Rāhula to meditate on not-self, which he immediately puts into practice. Seeing him, Venerable Sāriputta advises him to develop breath meditation, but the Buddha suggests a wide range of different practices first.	
MN 63	Majjhimapannāsapāli - The Middle Fifty Discourses	Bhikkhu Vagga - The Division on Bhikkhus	Cula-Malunkyovada Sutta	The Shorter Instructions to Malunkya
MN 63	Majjhimapannāsapāli - The Middle Fifty Discourses	Bhikkhu Vagga - The Division on Bhikkhus	A monk demands that the Buddha answer his metaphysical questions, or else he will disrobe. The Buddha compares him to a man struck by an arrow, who refuses treatment until he can have all his questions about the arrow and the archer answered.	
MN 64	Majjhimapannāsapāli - The Middle Fifty Discourses	Bhikkhu Vagga - The Division on Bhikkhus	Maha-Malunkyaputta Sutta	The Greater Instructions to Malunkya
MN 64	Majjhimapannāsapāli - The Middle Fifty Discourses	Bhikkhu Vagga - The Division on Bhikkhus	A little baby has no wrong views or intentions, but the underlying tendency for these things is still there. Without practicing, they will inevitably recur.	
MN 65	Majjhimapannāsapāli - The Middle Fifty Discourses	Bhikkhu Vagga - The Division on Bhikkhus	Bhaddali Sutta	To Bhaddali
MN 65	Majjhimapannāsapāli - The Middle Fifty Discourses	Bhikkhu Vagga - The Division on Bhikkhus	A monk refuses to follow the rule forbidding eating after noon, but is filled with remorse and forgiven.	
MN 66	Majjhimapannāsapāli - The Middle Fifty Discourses	Bhikkhu Vagga - The Division on Bhikkhus	Latukikopama Sutta	The Quail Simile
MN 66	Majjhimapannāsapāli - The Middle Fifty Discourses	Bhikkhu Vagga - The Division on Bhikkhus	Again raising the rule regarding eating, but this time as a reflection of gratitude for the Buddha in eliminating things that cause complexity and stress. The Buddha emphasizes how attachment even to little things can be dangerous.	
MN 67	Majjhimapannāsapāli - The Middle Fifty Discourses	Bhikkhu Vagga - The Division on Bhikkhus	Catuma Sutta	At Catuma
MN 67	Majjhimapannāsapāli - The Middle Fifty Discourses	Bhikkhu Vagga - The Division on Bhikkhus	After dismissing some unruly monks, the Buddha is persuaded to relent, and teaches them four dangers for those gone forth.	
MN 68	Majjhimapannāsapāli - The Middle Fifty Discourses	Bhikkhu Vagga - The Division on Bhikkhus	Nalakapana Sutta	At Nalakapana
MN 68	Majjhimapannāsapāli - The Middle Fifty Discourses	Bhikkhu Vagga - The Division on Bhikkhus	Those who practice do so not because they are failures, but because they aspire to higher freedom. When he speaks of the attainments of disciples, the Buddha does so in order to inspire.	
MN 69	Majjhimapannāsapāli - The Middle Fifty Discourses	Bhikkhu Vagga - The Division on Bhikkhus	Gulissani Sutta	Gulissani
MN 69	Majjhimapannāsapāli - The Middle Fifty Discourses	Bhikkhu Vagga - The Division on Bhikkhus	A monk comes down to the community from the wilderness, but doesn’t behave properly. Venerable Sāriputta explains how a mendicant should behave, whether in forest or town.	
MN 70	Majjhimapannāsapāli - The Middle Fifty Discourses	Bhikkhu Vagga - The Division on Bhikkhus	Kīṭāgiri Sutta	At Kitagiri
MN 70	Majjhimapannāsapāli - The Middle Fifty Discourses	Bhikkhu Vagga - The Division on Bhikkhus	A third discourse that presents the health benefits of eating in one part of the day, and the reluctance of some mendicants to follow this.	
MN 71	Majjhimapannāsapāli - The Middle Fifty Discourses	Paribbājaka Vagga - The Division on Wanderers	Tevijja Vacchagotta Sutta	To Vacchagotta on the Threefold True Knowledge
MN 71	Majjhimapannāsapāli - The Middle Fifty Discourses	Paribbājaka Vagga - The Division on Wanderers	The Buddha denies being omniscient, and sets forth the three higher knowledges that form the core of his awakened insight.	
MN 72	Majjhimapannāsapāli - The Middle Fifty Discourses	Paribbājaka Vagga - The Division on Wanderers	Aggi-Vacchagotta Sutta	To Vacchagotta on Fire
MN 72	Majjhimapannāsapāli - The Middle Fifty Discourses	Paribbājaka Vagga - The Division on Wanderers	Refusing to take a stance regarding useless metaphysical speculations, the Buddha illustrates the spiritual goal with the simile of a flame going out.	
MN 73	Majjhimapannāsapāli - The Middle Fifty Discourses	Paribbājaka Vagga - The Division on Wanderers	Maha-Vacchagotta Sutta	The Greater Discourse to Vacchagotta
MN 73	Majjhimapannāsapāli - The Middle Fifty Discourses	Paribbājaka Vagga - The Division on Wanderers	In the final installment of the “Vacchagotta trilogy”, Vacchagotta lets go his obsession with meaningless speculation, and asks about practice.	
MN 74	Majjhimapannāsapāli - The Middle Fifty Discourses	Paribbājaka Vagga - The Division on Wanderers	Dighanahka Sutta	To Dighanakha
MN 74	Majjhimapannāsapāli - The Middle Fifty Discourses	Paribbājaka Vagga - The Division on Wanderers	Deftly outmaneuvering an extreme skeptic, the Buddha discusses the outcomes of belief and disbelief. Rather than getting stuck in abstractions, he encourages staying close to the feelings one experiences.	
MN 75	Majjhimapannāsapāli - The Middle Fifty Discourses	Paribbājaka Vagga - The Division on Wanderers	Magandiya Sutta	To Magandiya
MN 75	Majjhimapannāsapāli - The Middle Fifty Discourses	Paribbājaka Vagga - The Division on Wanderers	Accused by a hedonist of being too negative, the Buddha recounts the luxury of his upbringing, and his realization of how little value there was in such things. Through renunciation he found a far greater pleasure.	
MN 76	Majjhimapannāsapāli - The Middle Fifty Discourses	Paribbājaka Vagga - The Division on Wanderers	Sandaka Sutta	To Sandaka
MN 76	Majjhimapannāsapāli - The Middle Fifty Discourses	Paribbājaka Vagga - The Division on Wanderers	Venerable Ānanda teaches a group of wanderers how there are many different approaches to the spiritual life, many of which lead nowhere.	
MN 77	Majjhimapannāsapāli - The Middle Fifty Discourses	Paribbājaka Vagga - The Division on Wanderers	Maha-sakuludayi Sutta	The Greater Discourse to Sakuludayin
MN 77	Majjhimapannāsapāli - The Middle Fifty Discourses	Paribbājaka Vagga - The Division on Wanderers	Unlike many teachers, the Buddha’s followers treat him with genuine love and respect, since they see the sincerity of his teaching and practice.	
MN 78	Majjhimapannāsapāli - The Middle Fifty Discourses	Paribbājaka Vagga - The Division on Wanderers	Samana-Mundika Sutta	Mundika the Contemplative
MN 78	Majjhimapannāsapāli - The Middle Fifty Discourses	Paribbājaka Vagga - The Division on Wanderers	A wanderer teaches that a person has reached the highest attainment when they keep four basic ethical precepts. The Buddha’s standards are considerably higher.	
MN 79	Majjhimapannāsapāli - The Middle Fifty Discourses	Paribbājaka Vagga - The Division on Wanderers	Cula-sakuludayi Sutta	The Shorter Discourse to Sakuludayin
MN 79	Majjhimapannāsapāli - The Middle Fifty Discourses	Paribbājaka Vagga - The Division on Wanderers	A wanderer teaches his doctrine of the “highest splendor” but is unable to give a satisfactory account of what that means. The Buddha memorably compares him to someone who is in love with an idealized woman who he has never met.	
MN 80	Majjhimapannāsapāli - The Middle Fifty Discourses	Paribbājaka Vagga - The Division on Wanderers	Vekhanassa Sutta	To Vekhanassa
MN 80	Majjhimapannāsapāli - The Middle Fifty Discourses	Paribbājaka Vagga - The Division on Wanderers	Starting off similar to the previous, the Buddha goes on to explain that one is not converted to his teaching just because of clever arguments, but because you see in yourself the results of the practice.	
MN 81	Majjhimapannāsapāli - The Middle Fifty Discourses	Rāja Vagga - The Division on Kings	Ghatikara Sutta	Ghatikara the Potter
MN 81	Majjhimapannāsapāli - The Middle Fifty Discourses	Rāja Vagga - The Division on Kings	The Buddha relates an unusual account of a past life in the time of the previous Buddha, Kassapa. At that time he was not interested in Dhamma, and had to be forced to go see the Buddha. This discourse is important in understanding the development of the Bodhisattva doctrine.	
MN 82	Majjhimapannāsapāli - The Middle Fifty Discourses	Rāja Vagga - The Division on Kings	Ratthapala Sutta	About Ratthapala
MN 82	Majjhimapannāsapāli - The Middle Fifty Discourses	Rāja Vagga - The Division on Kings	A wealthy young man, Raṭṭhapāla, has a strong aspiration to go forth, but has to prevail against the reluctance of his parents. Even after he became a monk, his parents tried to persuade him to disrobe. The discourse ends with a moving series of teachings on the fragility of the world.	
MN 83	Majjhimapannāsapāli - The Middle Fifty Discourses	Rāja Vagga - The Division on Kings	Makhadeva Sutta	About King Makhadeva
MN 83	Majjhimapannāsapāli - The Middle Fifty Discourses	Rāja Vagga - The Division on Kings	A rare extended mythic narrative, telling of an ancient kingly lineage and their eventual downfall.	
MN 84	Majjhimapannāsapāli - The Middle Fifty Discourses	Rāja Vagga - The Division on Kings	Madhura Sutta	At Madhura
MN 84	Majjhimapannāsapāli - The Middle Fifty Discourses	Rāja Vagga - The Division on Kings	In Madhurā, towards the north-western limit of the Buddha’s reach during his life, King Avantiputta asks Venerable Mahākaccāna regarding the brahmanical claim to be the highest caste.	
MN 85	Majjhimapannāsapāli - The Middle Fifty Discourses	Rāja Vagga - The Division on Kings	Bodhirajakumara Sutta	To Prince Bodhi
MN 85	Majjhimapannāsapāli - The Middle Fifty Discourses	Rāja Vagga - The Division on Kings	Admitting that he used to believe that pleasure was to be gained through pain, the Buddha explains how his practice showed him the fallacy of that idea.	
MN 86	Majjhimapannāsapāli - The Middle Fifty Discourses	Rāja Vagga - The Division on Kings	Angulimala Sutta	About Angulimala
MN 86	Majjhimapannāsapāli - The Middle Fifty Discourses	Rāja Vagga - The Division on Kings	Ignoring warnings, the Buddha ventures into the domain of the notorious killer Aṅgulimāla and succeeds in converting him to the path of non-violence. After becoming a monk Aṅgulimāla still suffered for his past deeds, but only to a small extent. He uses his new commitment to non-violence to help a woman in labor.	
MN 87	Majjhimapannāsapāli - The Middle Fifty Discourses	Rāja Vagga - The Division on Kings	Piyajatika Sutta	From One Who Is Dear
MN 87	Majjhimapannāsapāli - The Middle Fifty Discourses	Rāja Vagga - The Division on Kings	A rare glimpse into the marital life of King Pasenadi, and how he is led to the Dhamma by his Queen, the incomparable Mallikā. She confirms the Buddha’s teaching that our loved ones bring us sorrow; but that’s not something a husband, father, and king wants to hear.	
MN 88	Majjhimapannāsapāli - The Middle Fifty Discourses	Rāja Vagga - The Division on Kings	Bahitika Sutta	The Cloak
MN 88	Majjhimapannāsapāli - The Middle Fifty Discourses	Rāja Vagga - The Division on Kings	King Pasenadi takes a chance to visit Venerable Ānanda, where he asks about skillful and unskillful behavior, and what is praised by the Buddha. He offers Ānanda a valuable cloth in gratitude.	
MN 89	Majjhimapannāsapāli - The Middle Fifty Discourses	Rāja Vagga - The Division on Kings	Dhammacetiya Sutta	Monuments to the Dhamma
MN 89	Majjhimapannāsapāli - The Middle Fifty Discourses	Rāja Vagga - The Division on Kings	King Pasenadi, near the end of his life, visits the Buddha, and shows moving devotion and love for his teacher.	
MN 90	Majjhimapannāsapāli - The Middle Fifty Discourses	Rāja Vagga - The Division on Kings	Kannakatthala Sutta	At Kannakatthala
MN 90	Majjhimapannāsapāli - The Middle Fifty Discourses	Rāja Vagga - The Division on Kings	King Pasenadi questions the Buddha on miscellaneous matters: caste, omniscience, and the gods among them.	
MN 91	Majjhimapannāsapāli - The Middle Fifty Discourses	Brāhmaṇa Vagga - The Division on Brahmins	Brahmayu Sutta	Brahmayu
MN 91	Majjhimapannāsapāli - The Middle Fifty Discourses	Brāhmaṇa Vagga - The Division on Brahmins	The oldest and most respected brahmin of the age sends a student to examine the Buddha, and he spends several months following his every move before reporting back. Convinced that the Buddha fulfills an ancient prophecy of the Great Man, the brahmin becomes his disciple.	
MN 92	Majjhimapannāsapāli - The Middle Fifty Discourses	Brāhmaṇa Vagga - The Division on Brahmins	Sela Sutta	To Sela
MN 92	Majjhimapannāsapāli - The Middle Fifty Discourses	Brāhmaṇa Vagga - The Division on Brahmins	A brahmanical ascetic named Keṇiya invites the entire Saṅgha for a meal. When the brahmin Sela sees what is happening, he visits the Buddha and expresses his delight in a moving series of devotional verses.	
MN 93	Majjhimapannāsapāli - The Middle Fifty Discourses	Brāhmaṇa Vagga - The Division on Brahmins	Assalayana Sutta	To Assalayana
MN 93	Majjhimapannāsapāli - The Middle Fifty Discourses	Brāhmaṇa Vagga - The Division on Brahmins	A precocious brahmin student is encouraged against his wishes to challenge the Buddha on the question of caste. His reluctance turns out to be justified.	
MN 94	Majjhimapannāsapāli - The Middle Fifty Discourses	Brāhmaṇa Vagga - The Division on Brahmins	Ghotamukha Sutta	To Ghotamukha
MN 94	Majjhimapannāsapāli - The Middle Fifty Discourses	Brāhmaṇa Vagga - The Division on Brahmins	A brahmin denies that there is such a thing as a principled renunciate life, but Venerable Udena persuades him otherwise.	
MN 95	Majjhimapannāsapāli - The Middle Fifty Discourses	Brāhmaṇa Vagga - The Division on Brahmins	Canki Sutta	With Canki
MN 95	Majjhimapannāsapāli - The Middle Fifty Discourses	Brāhmaṇa Vagga - The Division on Brahmins	The reputed brahmin Caṅkī goes with a large group to visit the Buddha, despite the reservations of other brahmins. A precocious student challenges the Buddha, affirming the validity of the Vedic scriptures. The Buddha gives a detailed explanation of how true understanding gradually emerges through spiritual education.	
MN 96	Majjhimapannāsapāli - The Middle Fifty Discourses	Brāhmaṇa Vagga - The Division on Brahmins	Phasukari Sutta	To Phasukari
MN 96	Majjhimapannāsapāli - The Middle Fifty Discourses	Brāhmaṇa Vagga - The Division on Brahmins	A brahmin claims that one deserves service and privilege depending on caste, but the Buddha counters that it is conduct, not caste, that show a person’s worth.	
MN 97	Majjhimapannāsapāli - The Middle Fifty Discourses	Brāhmaṇa Vagga - The Division on Brahmins	Dhananjani Sutta	To Dhananjani
MN 97	Majjhimapannāsapāli - The Middle Fifty Discourses	Brāhmaṇa Vagga - The Division on Brahmins	A corrupt tax-collector is redeemed by his encounter with Venerable Sāriputta.	
MN 98	Majjhimapannāsapāli - The Middle Fifty Discourses	Brāhmaṇa Vagga - The Division on Brahmins	Vasettha Sutta	To Vasettha
MN 98	Majjhimapannāsapāli - The Middle Fifty Discourses	Brāhmaṇa Vagga - The Division on Brahmins	Two brahmin students ask the Buddha about what makes a brahmin: birth or deeds? the Buddha points out that, while the species of animals are determined by birth, for humans what matters is how you chose to live. This discourse anticipates the modern view that there are no such things as clearly defined racial differences among humans.	
MN 99	Majjhimapannāsapāli - The Middle Fifty Discourses	Brāhmaṇa Vagga - The Division on Brahmins	Subha Sutta	To Subha
MN 99	Majjhimapannāsapāli - The Middle Fifty Discourses	Brāhmaṇa Vagga - The Division on Brahmins	Working hard is not valuable in and of itself; what matters is the outcome. And just as in lay life, spiritual practice may or may not lead to fruitful results.	
MN 100	Majjhimapannāsapāli - The Middle Fifty Discourses	Brāhmaṇa Vagga - The Division on Brahmins	Sangarava Sutta	To Sangarava
MN 100	Majjhimapannāsapāli - The Middle Fifty Discourses	Brāhmaṇa Vagga - The Division on Brahmins	Angered by the devotion of a brahmin lady, a brahmin visits the Buddha. He positions himself against traditionalists and rationalists, as someone whose teaching is based on direct experience.	
MN 101	Uparipannāsapāli - The Final Fifty Discourses	Devadaha Vagga - The Division at Devadaha	Devadaha Sutta	To Devadaha
MN 101	Uparipannāsapāli - The Final Fifty Discourses	Devadaha Vagga - The Division at Devadaha	The Buddha tackles a group of Jain ascetics, pressing them on their claim to be practicing to end all suffering by self-mortification. He points out a series of fallacies in their logic, and explains his own middle way.	
MN 102	Uparipannāsapāli - The Final Fifty Discourses	Devadaha Vagga - The Division at Devadaha	Pancattaya Sutta	The Five and Three
MN 102	Uparipannāsapāli - The Final Fifty Discourses	Devadaha Vagga - The Division at Devadaha	A middle length version of the more famous Brahmajala Sutta (DN1), this surveys a range of speculative views and dismisses them all.	
MN 103	Uparipannāsapāli - The Final Fifty Discourses	Devadaha Vagga - The Division at Devadaha	Kinti Sutta	What Do You Think About Me?
MN 103	Uparipannāsapāli - The Final Fifty Discourses	Devadaha Vagga - The Division at Devadaha	The Buddha teaches the monks to not dispute about the fundamental teachings, but to always strive for harmony.	
MN 104	Uparipannāsapāli - The Final Fifty Discourses	Devadaha Vagga - The Division at Devadaha	Samagama Sutta	At Samagama
MN 104	Uparipannāsapāli - The Final Fifty Discourses	Devadaha Vagga - The Division at Devadaha	Hearing of the death of the Jain leader Nigaṇṭha Nātaputta, the Buddha encourages the Saṅgha to swiftly resolve any disputes. He lays down a series of seven methods for resolving disputes. These form the foundation for the monastic code.	
MN 105	Uparipannāsapāli - The Final Fifty Discourses	Devadaha Vagga - The Division at Devadaha	Sunakkhatta Sutta	To Sunakkhatta
MN 105	Uparipannāsapāli - The Final Fifty Discourses	Devadaha Vagga - The Division at Devadaha	Not all of those who claim to be awakened are genuine. The Buddha teaches how true spiritual progress depends on an irreversible letting go of the forces that lead to suffering.	
MN 106	Uparipannāsapāli - The Final Fifty Discourses	Devadaha Vagga - The Division at Devadaha	Aneñja-sappaya Sutta	Conducive to the Imperturbable
MN 106	Uparipannāsapāli - The Final Fifty Discourses	Devadaha Vagga - The Division at Devadaha	Beginning with profound meditation absorption, the Buddha goes on to deeper and deeper levels, showing how insight on this basis leads to the detaching of consciousness from any form of rebirth.	
MN 107	Uparipannāsapāli - The Final Fifty Discourses	Devadaha Vagga - The Division at Devadaha	Ganaka-Moggallana Sutta	The Discourse to Ganaka-Moggallana
MN 107	Uparipannāsapāli - The Final Fifty Discourses	Devadaha Vagga - The Division at Devadaha	The Buddha compares the training of an accountant with the step by step spiritual path of his followers. But even with such a well explained path, the Buddha can only show the way, and it is up to us to walk it.	
MN 108	Uparipannāsapāli - The Final Fifty Discourses	Devadaha Vagga - The Division at Devadaha	Gopaka-Moggallana Sutta	Moggallana the Guardsman
MN 108	Uparipannāsapāli - The Final Fifty Discourses	Devadaha Vagga - The Division at Devadaha	Amid rising military tensions after the Buddha’s death, Venerable Ānanda is questioned about how the Saṅgha planned to continue in their teacher’s absence. As the Buddha refused to appoint a successor, the teaching and practice that he laid down become the teacher, and the Saṅgha resolves issues by consensus.	
MN 109	Uparipannāsapāli - The Final Fifty Discourses	Devadaha Vagga - The Division at Devadaha	Maha-punnama Sutta	The Great Full-moon Night Discourse
MN 109	Uparipannāsapāli - The Final Fifty Discourses	Devadaha Vagga - The Division at Devadaha	On a lovely full moon night, one of the mendicants presents the Buddha with a series of questions that go to the heart of the teaching. But when he hears of the doctrine of not-self, another mendicant is unable to grasp the meaning.	
MN 110	Uparipannāsapāli - The Final Fifty Discourses	Devadaha Vagga - The Division at Devadaha	Cula-punnama Sutta	The Shorter Discourse on the Full-moon Night
MN 110	Uparipannāsapāli - The Final Fifty Discourses	Devadaha Vagga - The Division at Devadaha	A good person is able to understand a bad person, but not vice versa.	
MN 111	Uparipannāsapāli - The Final Fifty Discourses	Anupada Vagga - The Division of One by One	Anupada Sutta	One by One as they Occurred
MN 111	Uparipannāsapāli - The Final Fifty Discourses	Anupada Vagga - The Division of One by One	The Buddha describes in technical detail the process of insight of Venerable Sāriputta. Many ideas and terms in this text anticipate the Abhidhamma.	
MN 112	Uparipannāsapāli - The Final Fifty Discourses	Anupada Vagga - The Division of One by One	Chabbisodhana Sutta	The Sixfold Purity
MN 112	Uparipannāsapāli - The Final Fifty Discourses	Anupada Vagga - The Division of One by One	If someone claims to be awakened, their claim should be interrogated with a detailed series of detailed questions. Only if they can answer them clearly should the claim be accepted.	
MN 113	Uparipannāsapāli - The Final Fifty Discourses	Anupada Vagga - The Division of One by One	Sappurisa Sutta	The True Man
MN 113	Uparipannāsapāli - The Final Fifty Discourses	Anupada Vagga - The Division of One by One	The Buddha explains that a truly good person does not disparage others or feel superior because of their attainment.	
MN 114	Uparipannāsapāli - The Final Fifty Discourses	Anupada Vagga - The Division of One by One	Sevitabba Asevitabba Sutta	To Be Cultivated and Not to Be Cultivated
MN 114	Uparipannāsapāli - The Final Fifty Discourses	Anupada Vagga - The Division of One by One	The Buddha sets up a framework on things to be cultivated or avoided, and Venerable Sāriputta volunteers to elaborate.	
MN 115	Uparipannāsapāli - The Final Fifty Discourses	Anupada Vagga - The Division of One by One	Bahudhatuka Sutta	The Many Kinds of Elements
MN 115	Uparipannāsapāli - The Final Fifty Discourses	Anupada Vagga - The Division of One by One	Beginning by praising a wise person, the Buddha goes on to explain that one becomes wise by inquiring into the elements, sense fields, dependent origination, and what is possible and impossible.	
MN 116	Uparipannāsapāli - The Final Fifty Discourses	Anupada Vagga - The Division of One by One	Isigili Sutta	The Discourse at Isigili
MN 116	Uparipannāsapāli - The Final Fifty Discourses	Anupada Vagga - The Division of One by One	Reflecting on the changes that even geographical features undergo, the Buddha then recounts the names of sages of the past who have lived in Mount Isigili near Rājagaha.	
MN 117	Uparipannāsapāli - The Final Fifty Discourses	Anupada Vagga - The Division of One by One	Maha-cattarisaka Sutta	The Great Forty
MN 117	Uparipannāsapāli - The Final Fifty Discourses	Anupada Vagga - The Division of One by One	A discourse on the prerequisites of right samādhi that emphasizes the interrelationship and mutual support of all the factors of the eightfold path.	
MN 118	Uparipannāsapāli - The Final Fifty Discourses	Anupada Vagga - The Division of One by One	Anapanasati Sutta	Mindfulness of Breathing
MN 118	Uparipannāsapāli - The Final Fifty Discourses	Anupada Vagga - The Division of One by One	Surrounded by many well-practiced mendicants, the Buddha teaches mindfulness of breathing in detail, showing how they relate to the four kinds of mindfulness meditation.	
MN 119	Uparipannāsapāli - The Final Fifty Discourses	Anupada Vagga - The Division of One by One	Kayagatasati Sutta	Mindfulness Immersed in the Body
MN 119	Uparipannāsapāli - The Final Fifty Discourses	Anupada Vagga - The Division of One by One	This focuses on the first aspect of mindfulness meditation, the observation of the body. This set of practices, simple as they seem, have far-reaching benefits.	
MN 120	Uparipannāsapāli - The Final Fifty Discourses	Anupada Vagga - The Division of One by One	Sankharuppatti Sutta	Reappearance by Aspiration
MN 120	Uparipannāsapāli - The Final Fifty Discourses	Anupada Vagga - The Division of One by One	The Buddha explains how one can make a wish to be reborn in different realms.	
MN 121	Uparipannāsapāli - The Final Fifty Discourses	Suññata Vagga - The Division of Voidness	Cula-suññata Sutta	The Lesser Discourse on Emptiness
MN 121	Uparipannāsapāli - The Final Fifty Discourses	Suññata Vagga - The Division of Voidness	The Buddha describes his own practice of the meditation on emptiness.	
MN 122	Uparipannāsapāli - The Final Fifty Discourses	Suññata Vagga - The Division of Voidness	Maha-suññata Sutta	The Greater Discourse on Emptiness
MN 122	Uparipannāsapāli - The Final Fifty Discourses	Suññata Vagga - The Division of Voidness	A group of mendicants have taken to socializing too much, so the Buddha teaches on the importance of seclusion in order to enter fully into emptiness.	
MN 123	Uparipannāsapāli - The Final Fifty Discourses	Suññata Vagga - The Division of Voidness	Acchariyabbhutta Sutta	Wonderful and Marvelous
MN 123	Uparipannāsapāli - The Final Fifty Discourses	Suññata Vagga - The Division of Voidness	Venerable Ānanda is invited by the Buddha to speak on the Buddha’s amazing qualities, and proceeds to list a series of apparently miraculous events accompanying his birth. The Buddha caps it off by explaining what he thinks is really amazing about himself.	
MN 124	Uparipannāsapāli - The Final Fifty Discourses	Suññata Vagga - The Division of Voidness	Bakkula Sutta	About Venerable Bakkula
MN 124	Uparipannāsapāli - The Final Fifty Discourses	Suññata Vagga - The Division of Voidness	Venerable Bakkula, regarded as the healthiest of the mendicants, explains to an old friend his strict and austere practice. The unusual form of this discourse suggests it was added to the canon some time after the Buddha’s death.	
MN 125	Uparipannāsapāli - The Final Fifty Discourses	Suññata Vagga - The Division of Voidness	Dantabhumi Sutta	The Discourse on the "Tamed Stage"
MN 125	Uparipannāsapāli - The Final Fifty Discourses	Suññata Vagga - The Division of Voidness	A young monk is unable to persuade a prince of the blessings of peace of mind. The Buddha offers similes based on training an elephant that would have been successful, as this was a field the prince was familiar with.	
MN 126	Uparipannāsapāli - The Final Fifty Discourses	Suññata Vagga - The Division of Voidness	Bhumija Sutta	To Bhumija
MN 126	Uparipannāsapāli - The Final Fifty Discourses	Suññata Vagga - The Division of Voidness	Success in the spiritual life does not depend on any vows you may or may not make, but on whether you practice well.	
MN 127	Uparipannāsapāli - The Final Fifty Discourses	Suññata Vagga - The Division of Voidness	Anuruddha Sutta	To Anuruddha
MN 127	Uparipannāsapāli - The Final Fifty Discourses	Suññata Vagga - The Division of Voidness	A lay person becomes confused when encouraged to develop the “limitless” and “expansive” liberations, and asks Venerable Anuruddha to explain whether they are the same or different.	
MN 128	Uparipannāsapāli - The Final Fifty Discourses	Suññata Vagga - The Division of Voidness	Upakkilesa Sutta	Imperfections
MN 128	Uparipannāsapāli - The Final Fifty Discourses	Suññata Vagga - The Division of Voidness	A second discourse set at the quarrel of Kosambi, this depicts the Buddha, having failed to achieve reconciliation between the disputing mendicants, leaving the monastery. He spends time in the wilderness before encountering an inspiring community of practicing monks. There he discusses in detail obstacles to meditation that he encountered before awakening.	
MN 129	Uparipannāsapāli - The Final Fifty Discourses	Suññata Vagga - The Division of Voidness	Balapandita Sutta	Fools and Wise Men
MN 129	Uparipannāsapāli - The Final Fifty Discourses	Suññata Vagga - The Division of Voidness	A fool suffers both in this life and the next, while the astute benefits in both respects.	
MN 130	Uparipannāsapāli - The Final Fifty Discourses	Suññata Vagga - The Division of Voidness	Devaduta Sutta	The Divine Messengers
MN 130	Uparipannāsapāli - The Final Fifty Discourses	Suññata Vagga - The Division of Voidness	Expanding on the previous, this discourse contains the most detailed descriptions of the horrors of hell.	
MN 131	Uparipannāsapāli - The Final Fifty Discourses	Vibhaṅga Vagga - The Division of Expositions	Bhaddekaratta Sutta	An Auspicious Day
MN 131	Uparipannāsapāli - The Final Fifty Discourses	Vibhaṅga Vagga - The Division of Expositions	This discourse opens with a short but powerful set of verses extolling the benefits of insight into the here and now, followed by an explanation.	
MN 132	Uparipannāsapāli - The Final Fifty Discourses	Vibhaṅga Vagga - The Division of Expositions	Ananda Bhaddekaratta Sutta	Ananda and a Single Excellent Night
MN 132	Uparipannāsapāli - The Final Fifty Discourses	Vibhaṅga Vagga - The Division of Expositions	The same discourse as MN 131, but spoken by Venerable Ānanda.	
MN 133	Uparipannāsapāli - The Final Fifty Discourses	Vibhaṅga Vagga - The Division of Expositions	Maha-kaccana Bhaddekaratta Sutta	Maha-kaccana and a Single Excellent Night
MN 133	Uparipannāsapāli - The Final Fifty Discourses	Vibhaṅga Vagga - The Division of Expositions	The verses from MN 131 are explained in a different way by Venerable Mahakaccāna.	
MN 134	Uparipannāsapāli - The Final Fifty Discourses	Vibhaṅga Vagga - The Division of Expositions	Lomasakangiya Bhaddekaratta	Lomasakangiya and a Single Excellent Night
MN 134	Uparipannāsapāli - The Final Fifty Discourses	Vibhaṅga Vagga - The Division of Expositions	A monk who does not know the verses from MN 131 is encouraged by a deity to learn them.	
MN 135	Uparipannāsapāli - The Final Fifty Discourses	Vibhaṅga Vagga - The Division of Expositions	Cula-kammavibhanga Sutta	The Shorter Exposition of Kamma
MN 135	Uparipannāsapāli - The Final Fifty Discourses	Vibhaṅga Vagga - The Division of Expositions	The Buddha explains to a brahmin how your deeds in past lives affect you in this life.	
MN 136	Uparipannāsapāli - The Final Fifty Discourses	Vibhaṅga Vagga - The Division of Expositions	Maha-kammavibhanga Sutta	The Greater Exposition of Kamma
MN 136	Uparipannāsapāli - The Final Fifty Discourses	Vibhaṅga Vagga - The Division of Expositions	Confronted with an overly simplistic version of his own teachings, the Buddha emphasizes the often overlooked nuances and qualifications in how karma plays out.	
MN 137	Uparipannāsapāli - The Final Fifty Discourses	Vibhaṅga Vagga - The Division of Expositions	Salayatana-vibhanga Sutta	An Analysis of the Six Sense-media
MN 137	Uparipannāsapāli - The Final Fifty Discourses	Vibhaṅga Vagga - The Division of Expositions	A detailed analysis of the six senses and the relation to emotional and cognitive processes.	
MN 138	Uparipannāsapāli - The Final Fifty Discourses	Vibhaṅga Vagga - The Division of Expositions	Uddesa-vibhanga Sutta	An Analysis of the Statement
MN 138	Uparipannāsapāli - The Final Fifty Discourses	Vibhaṅga Vagga - The Division of Expositions	The Buddha gives a brief and enigmatic statement on the ways consciousness may become attached. Venerable Mahākaccāna is invited by the mendicants to draw out the implications.	
MN 139	Uparipannāsapāli - The Final Fifty Discourses	Vibhaṅga Vagga - The Division of Expositions	Aranavibhanga Sutta	An Analysis of Non-Conflict
MN 139	Uparipannāsapāli - The Final Fifty Discourses	Vibhaṅga Vagga - The Division of Expositions	Achieving peace is no simple matter. The Buddha explains how to avoid conflict through contentment, right speech, understanding pleasure, and not insisting on local conventions.	
MN 140	Uparipannāsapāli - The Final Fifty Discourses	Vibhaṅga Vagga - The Division of Expositions	Dhatu-vibhanga Sutta	An Analysis of the Properties
MN 140	Uparipannāsapāli - The Final Fifty Discourses	Vibhaṅga Vagga - The Division of Expositions	While staying overnight in a potter’s workshop, the Buddha has a chance encounter with a monk who does not recognize him. They have a long and profound discussion based on the four elements. This is one of the most insightful and moving discourses in the canon.	
MN 141	Uparipannāsapāli - The Final Fifty Discourses	Vibhaṅga Vagga - The Division of Expositions	Saccavibhanga Sutta	An Analysis of the Truths
MN 141	Uparipannāsapāli - The Final Fifty Discourses	Vibhaṅga Vagga - The Division of Expositions	Expanding on the Buddha’s first sermon, Venerable Sāriputta gives a detailed explanation of the four noble truths.	
MN 142	Uparipannāsapāli - The Final Fifty Discourses	Vibhaṅga Vagga - The Division of Expositions	Dakkhinavibhanga Sutta	The Exposition of Offerings
MN 142	Uparipannāsapāli - The Final Fifty Discourses	Vibhaṅga Vagga - The Division of Expositions	When his step-mother Mahāpajāpatī wishes to offer him a robe for his personal use, the Buddha encourages her to offer it to the entire Saṅgha instead. He goes on to explain that the best kind of offering to the Saṅgha is one given to the dual community of monks and nuns, headed by the Buddha.	
MN 143	Uparipannāsapāli - The Final Fifty Discourses	Saḷāyatana Vagga - The Division of the Sixfold Base	Anathapindikovada Sutta	Instructions to Anathapindika
MN 143	Uparipannāsapāli - The Final Fifty Discourses	Saḷāyatana Vagga - The Division of the Sixfold Base	As the great lay disciple Anāthapiṇḍika lies dying, Venerable Sāriputta visits him and gives a powerful teaching on non-attachment.	
MN 144	Uparipannāsapāli - The Final Fifty Discourses	Saḷāyatana Vagga - The Division of the Sixfold Base	Channovada Sutta	Instructions to Channa
MN 144	Uparipannāsapāli - The Final Fifty Discourses	Saḷāyatana Vagga - The Division of the Sixfold Base	The monk Channa is suffering a painful terminal illness and wishes to take his own life.	
MN 145	Uparipannāsapāli - The Final Fifty Discourses	Saḷāyatana Vagga - The Division of the Sixfold Base	Punnovada Sutta	Instructions to Punna
MN 145	Uparipannāsapāli - The Final Fifty Discourses	Saḷāyatana Vagga - The Division of the Sixfold Base	On the eve of his departure to a distant country, full of wild and unpredictable people, Venerable Puṇṇa is asked by the Buddha how he would respond if attacked there.	
MN 146	Uparipannāsapāli - The Final Fifty Discourses	Saḷāyatana Vagga - The Division of the Sixfold Base	Nandakovada Sutta	Nandaka's Exhortation
MN 146	Uparipannāsapāli - The Final Fifty Discourses	Saḷāyatana Vagga - The Division of the Sixfold Base	When asked to teach the nuns, Venerable Nandaka proceeds by inviting them to engage with his discourse and ask if there is anything that needs further explanation.	
MN 147	Uparipannāsapāli - The Final Fifty Discourses	Saḷāyatana Vagga - The Division of the Sixfold Base	Cula-rahulovada Sutta	The Shorter Discourse of Advice to Rāhula
MN 147	Uparipannāsapāli - The Final Fifty Discourses	Saḷāyatana Vagga - The Division of the Sixfold Base	The Buddha takes Rāhula with him to a secluded spot in order to lead him on to liberation.	
MN 148	Uparipannāsapāli - The Final Fifty Discourses	Saḷāyatana Vagga - The Division of the Sixfold Base	Chachakka Sutta	The Six Sextets
MN 148	Uparipannāsapāli - The Final Fifty Discourses	Saḷāyatana Vagga - The Division of the Sixfold Base	The Buddha analyzes the six senses from six perspectives, and demonstrates the emptiness of all of them.	
MN 149	Uparipannāsapāli - The Final Fifty Discourses	Saḷāyatana Vagga - The Division of the Sixfold Base	Maha-salayatanika Sutta	The Great Six Sense-media Discourse
MN 149	Uparipannāsapāli - The Final Fifty Discourses	Saḷāyatana Vagga - The Division of the Sixfold Base	Explains how insight into the six senses is integrated with the eightfold path and leads to liberation.	
MN 150	Uparipannāsapāli - The Final Fifty Discourses	Saḷāyatana Vagga - The Division of the Sixfold Base	Nagaravindeyya Sutta	To the Nagaravindans
MN 150	Uparipannāsapāli - The Final Fifty Discourses	Saḷāyatana Vagga - The Division of the Sixfold Base	In discussion with a group of householders, the Buddha helps them to distinguish those spiritual practitioners who are truly worthy of respect.	
MN 151	Uparipannāsapāli - The Final Fifty Discourses	Saḷāyatana Vagga - The Division of the Sixfold Base	Pindapataparisuddhi Sutta	The Purification of Almsfood
MN 151	Uparipannāsapāli - The Final Fifty Discourses	Saḷāyatana Vagga - The Division of the Sixfold Base	The Buddha notices Venerable Sāriputta’s glowing complexion, which is the result of his deep meditation. He then presents a series of reflections by which a mendicant can be sure that they are worthy of their alms-food.	
MN 152	Uparipannāsapāli - The Final Fifty Discourses	Saḷāyatana Vagga - The Division of the Sixfold Base	Indriya-bhavana Sutta	The Development of the Faculties
MN 152	Uparipannāsapāli - The Final Fifty Discourses	Saḷāyatana Vagga - The Division of the Sixfold Base	A brahmin teacher advocates that purification of the senses consists in simply avoiding seeing and hearing things. The Buddha explains that it is not about avoiding sense experience, but understanding it and learning to not be affected by sense experience."	

== See also ==
- List of suttas
  - List of Digha Nikaya suttas
  - List of Majjhima Nikaya suttas
  - List of Samyutta Nikaya suttas
  - List of Anguttara Nikaya suttas
  - List of Khuddaka Nikaya suttas
- Parable of the Poisoned Arrow

== Source of translations ==
- This article incorporates text from this source, which is by Bhante Sujato available under the CC0 license.
