= Vīmaṃsaka Sutta =

47th Sutta in the Majjhima Nikaya, Pāli Canon

The Vīmaṃsaka Sutta (MN 47, The Inquirer) is the 47th discourse within Majjhima Nikaya of Pāli Canon in Theravada Buddhism and paralleled by 求解 ('The discourse on investigating [for the sake of] understanding', MA 186 T 26.186) in the Madhyama Agama of the Chinese Taisho Tripitaka. According to Bhikkhu Analayo, this sutta and its Chinese parallel presents "a remarkable advocacy of free inquiry" by making the Buddha's claim to awakening the object of "the most searching scrutiny."

== Content ==
The sutta outlines the various ways that one can evaluate the Buddha himself (and by extension any spiritual teacher) to determine if their teaching is genuine and if they are truly liberated. The sutta begins thus:

"Bhikkhus, a bhikkhu who is an inquirer, not knowing how to gauge another’s mind, should make an investigation of the Tathāgata in order to find out whether or not he is fully enlightened."

One of these ways is seeing if the Buddha has a totally pure mind free of all defilements and mixed states of mind by using evidence such as their bodily actions and speech ("through the eye and through the ear"). The Buddha also encourages a monk to directly ask him about his mental states thus: ‘Are there found in the Tathāgata or not any defiled states cognizable through the eye or through the ear?’

Other questions that the student should investigate include whether the teacher attained his current state long ago or only recently (in the Chinese version this question is whether he has been practicing in a wholesome way for a long time or not) and whether he practices for the sake of fame or gain. Once the student gains a certain confidence in the Buddha and his teachings, they then put them into practice and verify their effectiveness through direct personal experience which leads to confidence (saddhā). If one has investigated and practiced well, one's faith and confidence will be strong:

"Bhikkhus, when anyone’s faith has been planted, rooted, and established in the Tathāgata through these reasons, terms, and phrases, his faith is said to be supported by reasons, rooted in vision, firm; it is invincible by any recluse or brahmin or god or Māra or Brahmā or by anyone in the world. That is how, bhikkhus, there is an investigation of the Tathāgata in accordance with the Dhamma, and that is how the Tathāgata is well investigated in accordance with the Dhamma."

In this way, an initial doubt about the Buddha and his dhamma is encouraged and seen as central to the growth of faith through evaluation and investigation of the teacher and their teachings. Thus, while doubt (vicikiccha) is seen as an obstacle and a hindrance to Buddhist practice, it is to be removed by a process of personal critical inquiry.

== See also ==
- Pāli Canon
- Sutta Piṭaka
- Majjhima Nikāya
- List of Majjhima Nikaya suttas
- Kalama Sutta
