= Mūlapariyāya Sutta =

1st Sutta in the Majjhima Nikaya, Pāli Canon

- Type: Canonical Text
- Parent Collection: Majjhima Nikaya
- Abbreviation: MN 1

The Mūlapariyāya Sutta (MN 1, The Root of all things or The Root Sequence) is a Theravada Buddhist discourse which "is one of the deepest and most difficult suttas in the Pali Canon." This discourse analyzes the thinking process of four different types of people and shows how the arising of dukkha is due to an intricate process which begins with perception and can only be ended by insight into the true nature of reality.

== Content ==
In this first sutta of the Majjhima Nikaya, the Buddha looks at thought process of four kinds of persons - untaught ordinary persons (puthujjana), disciples of the higher training (a sekha, who has at least achieved stream entry), arahants, and the Tathagata and how they deal with the root or foundation (mūla) of suffering which is desire born of ignorance.

The first kind of person is said to be a regular person and hence ignorant of the dhamma. The Buddha states how this kind of person deals with experience in the following manner:

Perceiving earth as earth, he conceives [things] about earth, he conceives [things] in earth, he conceives [things] coming out of earth, he conceives earth as 'mine,' he delights in earth. Why is that? Because he has not comprehended it, I tell you.

The discourse then continues to list all of the things the ordinary ignorant person conceives (maññanā) and delights in. These objects of thought are termed the 'Twenty-four bases (vatthus) of cognition' and range from the most gross aspects of experience to the most subtle. The vatthus are:

- The four elements - ie matter.
- The different beings in the universe and their planes of existence, from normal beings to the divine realms of the devas and Brahma.
- The dimensions of "infinite space", "infinite consciousness", "infinite nothingness" and "neither perception nor non perception".
- Four classes of sense data - the seen, heard, sensed (smelling, tasting and touching) and cognizance.
- The abstract categories of diversity, unity and totality or “The All.”
- Nibbāna.

The ordinary process of the untaught world-ling's conception of the world is filled with ignorance and conceptual proliferation (papañca) from the initial moment of sensory perception. This leads to conceiving 'things in' and 'coming out' of whatever he perceives. This refers to how everyone develops views (diṭṭhi) about how things are, how they should be and how they should relate to them, from simple views to complex metaphysical speculations. People also develop conceptions of themselves as having a solid Self, and they also become attached to things when they delight (nandi) in them which leads to craving and clinging. Ordinary people conceive of things by identifying with them, by wanting to possess them, by seeing their self as being contained in them or by seeing their self as being separate from them. This process begins at perception, which is already distorted for the untaught person who conceives and projects self-hood, solidity and expectations into his field of experience. The stage of "conceiving" (mañati) is really a state of cognitive distortion, which is led by the three defilements of craving (taṇhā), conceit (māna), and views (diṭṭhi). It is in this sense that the untaught person is said to be deluded.

This process is an outline of the interdependent arising of suffering in the minds different kinds of people and how this process is counteracted by those who have taken up the teachings of the Buddha. The sutta goes on to elucidate how each other type of person gets closer and closer to the goal of nibbana by knowing things as they are and not delighting and clinging to them. The disciple in the higher training attempts not to conceive of things in a wrong way by not identifying with them and by not clinging to them. He does this by directly knowing things as they are, ie as impermanent, suffering, and non-self. He disciple must be vigilant because he has still not eradicated subtle mental dispositions of clinging. The arahant and the Tathagata are awakened beings and therefore see directly into the truth of reality with no distorted conceptions, having uprooted all trace of the three defilements.

According to Thanissaro Bhikkhu, this sutta is a response to the Indian philosophical school called Samkhya and parallels their philosophy while at the same time critiquing it. This school was said to have been founded by a philosopher called Uddalaka who posited there was a "root" principle which was in all things and gave birth to all things, a sort of "ground of being" called Mula-Prakṛti. According to the Theravadan commentaries, the monks listening in this sutta were Brahmins who even after being ordained continued to hold to some of their previous views. This helps explains why the sutta ends with the very rare sentence: "Displeased, the monks did not delight in the Blessed One's words."

== See also ==
- Dependent Origination
- Three marks of existence
- List of Majjhima Nikaya suttas
