= Kesamutti Sutta =

Discourse of the Buddha

Translations of Kesamutti Sutta
- Pali: Kesamuttisuttaṃ, Kālāmasuttaṃ
- Bengali: কালাম সূত্র
- Burmese: Kalama thoke, ကာလာမ သုတ်
- Thai: กาลามสูตร

The Kesamutti Sutta, popularly known in the West as the Kālāma Sutta, is a discourse of the Buddha contained in the Aṅguttara Nikaya (3.65) of the Pali Canon. Although traditionally preserved in the Theravada canonical set, it is often cited by those of the Theravada and Mahayana traditions alike as the Buddha's "charter of free inquiry."

== Premise ==
The sutta starts off by describing how the Buddha passes through the village of Kesaputta and is greeted by its inhabitants, a clan called the Kalamas. They ask for his advice: they say that many wandering holy men and ascetics pass through, expounding their teachings and criticizing the teachings of others. So whose teachings should they follow? He delivers in response a sermon that serves as an entry point to the Dhamma, the Buddhist teachings for those unconvinced by mere spectacular revelation.

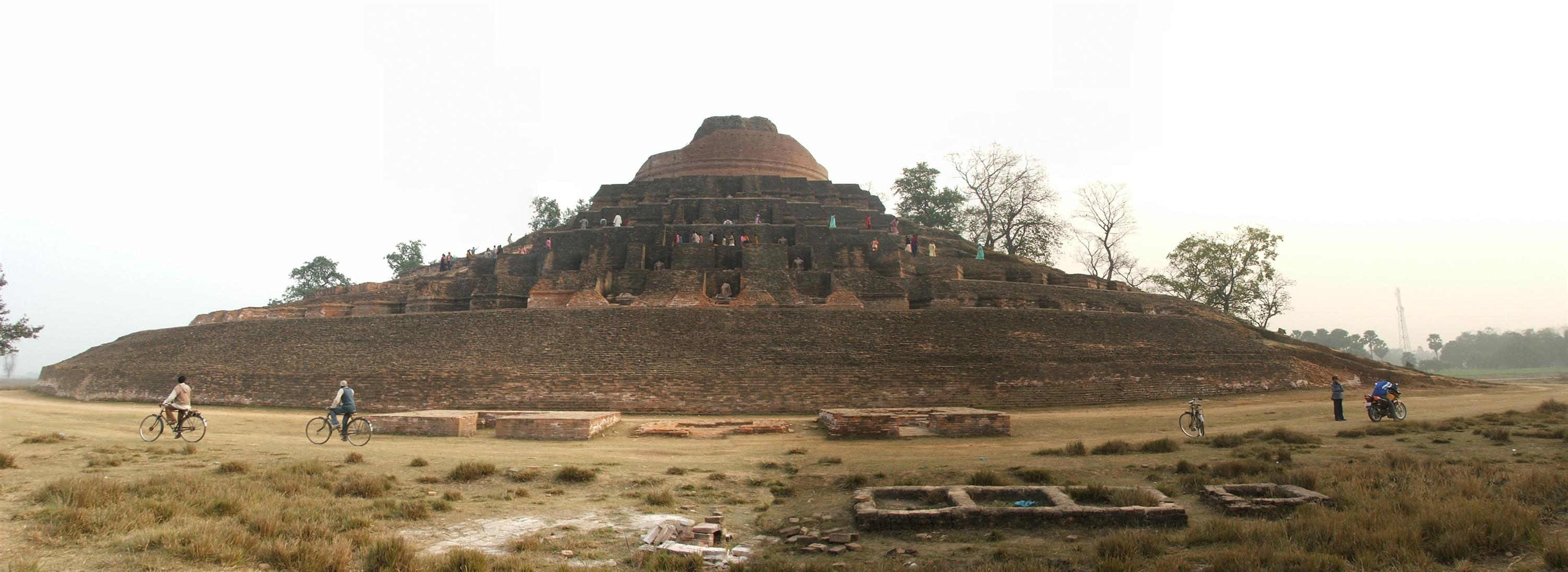
The Kesariya stupa is believed to be at the place where The Buddha delivered the discourse

=== Discerning Religious Teachings ===
The Buddha proceeds to list the criteria by which any sensible person can decide which teachings to accept as true. Do not blindly believe religious teachings, he tells the Kalamas, just because they are claimed to be true, or even through the application of various methods or techniques. Direct knowledge grounded in one's own experience can be called upon. He advises that the words of the wise should be heeded and taken into account. He proposes not a passive acceptance but, rather, constant questioning and personal testing to identify those truths which verifiably reduce one's own suffering or misery (Pali: dukkha).

The Kesamutti Sutta states (Pali expression in parentheses):

- Do not go upon what has been acquired by repeated hearing (anussava),
- nor upon tradition (paramparā),
- nor upon rumor (itikirā),
- nor upon what is in a scripture (piṭaka-sampadāna)
- nor upon surmise (takka-hetu),
- nor upon an axiom (naya-hetu),
- nor upon specious reasoning (ākāra-parivitakka),
- nor upon a bias towards a notion that has been pondered over (diṭṭhi-nijjhān-akkh-antiyā),
- nor upon another's seeming ability (bhabba-rūpatāya),
- nor upon the consideration 'The monk is our teacher (samaṇo no garū)'
- Kalamas, when you yourselves know 'These things are good; these things are not blameable; these things are praised by the wise; undertaken and observed, these things lead to benefit and happiness,' enter on and abide in them.

Thus, the Buddha named ten specific sources whose knowledge should not be immediately viewed as truthful without further investigation to avoid fallacies:

1. Oral history
2. Tradition
3. News sources
4. Scriptures or other official texts
5. Suppositional reasoning
6. Philosophical dogmatism
7. Common sense
8. One's own opinions
9. Experts
10. Authorities or one's own teacher

Instead, the Buddha says, only when one personally knows that a certain teaching is skillful, blameless, praiseworthy, and conducive to happiness, and that it is praised by the wise, should one then accept it as true and practice it. Thus, as stated by Soma Thera, the Kalama Sutta is just that, the Buddha's charter of free inquiry:

The instruction of the Kalamas (Kalama Sutta) is justly famous for its encouragement of free inquiry; the spirit of the sutta signifies a teaching that is exempt from fanaticism, bigotry, dogmatism, and intolerance.

However, as stated by Bhikkhu Bodhi, this teaching is not intended as an endorsement for either radical skepticism or as for the creation of unreasonable personal truth:

On the basis of a single passage, quoted out of context, the Buddha has been made out to be a pragmatic empiricist who dismisses all doctrine and faith, and whose Dhamma is simply a freethinker's kit to truth which invites each one to accept and reject whatever he likes.

Rather than supporting skepticism or subjective truths, in the sutta the Buddha continues to argue that the three unwholesome roots of greed, hatred and delusion lead to the opposite negative results, i.e. they are unskillful, blameworthy, etc. Consequently, behaviour based on these three roots should be abandoned. Moral judgements of actions can therefore be deduced by analysing whether these actions are based on the unwholesome roots or not.

== The Buddha's Assurances ==
The first and main part of the Kesamutti Sutta is often quoted, but an equally important section of the Kesamutti Sutta follows on from this. This section (17) features the Buddha's four assurances, or solaces. The Buddha asserts that a moral life would be happy and appropriate whether or not there is karma or reincarnation. The logic is comparable to that of Pascal's wager.

The disciple of the Noble Ones, Kalamas, who has such a hate-free mind, such a malice-free mind, such an undefiled mind, and such a purified mind, is one by whom four solaces are found here and now.

'Suppose there is a hereafter and there is a fruit, result, of deeds done well or ill. Then it is possible that at the dissolution of the body after death, I shall arise in the heavenly world, which is possessed of the state of bliss.' This is the first solace found by him.

'Suppose there is no hereafter and there is no fruit, no result, of deeds done well or ill. Yet in this world, here and now, free from hatred, free from malice, safe and sound, and happy, I keep myself.' This is the second solace found by him.

'Suppose evil (results) befall an evil-doer. I, however, think of doing evil to no one. Then, how can ill (results) affect me who do no evil deed?' This is the third solace found by him.

'Suppose evil (results) do not befall an evil-doer. Then I see myself purified in any case.' This is the fourth solace found by him.

The disciple of the Noble Ones, Kalamas, who has such a hate-free mind, such a malice-free mind, such an undefiled mind, and such a purified mind, is one by whom, here and now, these four solaces are found.

—

On these four solaces, Soma Thera wrote:

The Kalama Sutta, which sets forth the principles that should be followed by a seeker of truth, and which contains a standard things are judged by, belongs to a framework of the Dhamma; the four solaces taught in the sutta point out the extent to which the Buddha permits suspense of judgment in matters beyond normal cognition. The solaces show that the reason for a virtuous life does not necessarily depend on belief in rebirth or retribution, but on mental well-being acquired through the overcoming of greed, hate, and delusion.

== See also ==
- Vīmaṃsaka Sutta
