= Vitakkasaṇṭhāna Sutta =

20th Sutta in the Majjhima Nikaya, Pāli Canon

The Vitakkasanthana Sutta (MN 20) (The Removal of Distracting Thoughts) is the 20th discourse in Majjhima Nikaya of Pāli Canon in Theravada Buddhism.

In the Theravadin Tipitaka, the Vitakka-saṇṭhāna Sutta is the twentieth discourse in the Majjhima Nikaya (MN) and is thus often designated by "MN 20"; in the Pali Text Society (PTS) edition of the Canon, this text begins on the 118th page of the first volume of its three-volume Majjhima Nikaya (M), and is thus alternately represented as "M i 118".

== Title and content ==
English translations have employed several different titles for the Vitakka-saṇṭhāna Sutta, including The Removal of Distracting Thoughts, The Discursively Thinking Mind, and The Relaxation of Thoughts.

The Vitakka-saṇṭhāna Sutta describes five approaches for overcoming negative thoughts. Translators into English have used different terms to designate the purpose, nature, and components of these approaches. One translation begins by stating that

When a monk is intent on the heightened mind, there are five themes he should attend to at the appropriate times.

Other translators or commentators refer to five "things," "signs," or "strategies". The purpose of these five approaches is variously described as attaining "higher consciousness," "higher mind," "developing the mind", "heightened mind", or "freedom". To implement these approaches, one is enjoined to "reflect on", "give attention to", "attend to", or "employ" each approach.

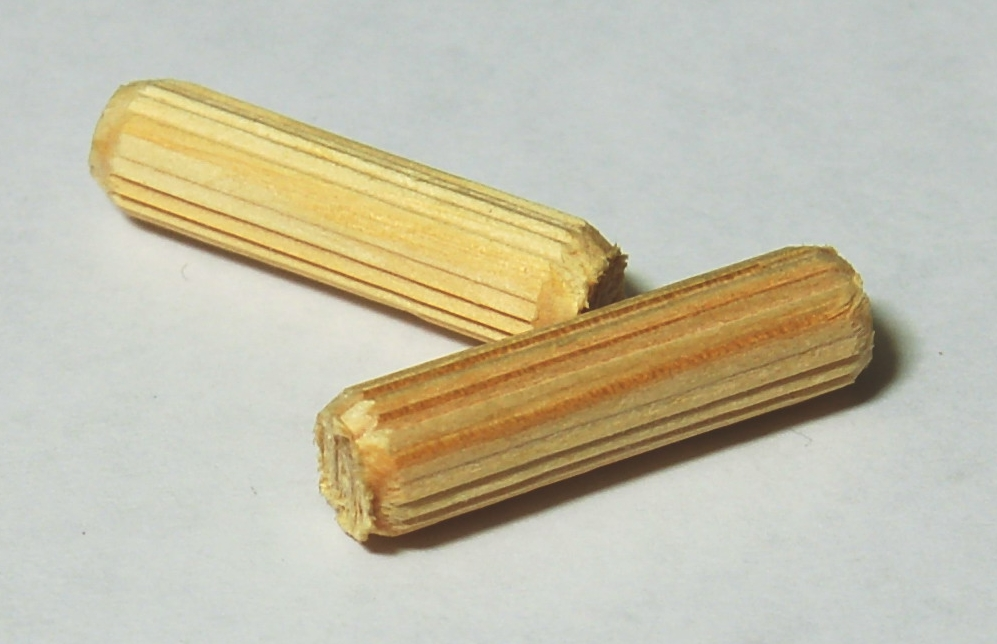
Smaller and larger (finer and coarser) wooden pegs used by carpenters

In describing the first of the five approaches, the sutta uses the analogy of a carpenter's peg. In the language of one translation, when the mind has become filled with hatred or illusion by dwelling on a bad ("adventitious") object, the aspirant (bhikku) should replace the bad thought with a good ("skilled") thought (Pali: tato nimittato aññam nimittam):

Like an experienced carpenter or carpenter's apprentice, striking hard at, pushing out, and getting rid of a coarse peg with a fine one, should the bhikkhu in order to get rid of the adventitious object, reflect on a different object which is connected with skill.

If thoughts still arise that are "negative" or "evil" and "unskilled", "unwholesome", or "demeritorious," the second recommended approach is as follows: The aspirant should "reflect on the consequences", "ponder on the disadvantages" "examine the danger[s]", or "scrutinize the drawbacks" of such thoughts (Pali: manasikatabbam).

If negative thoughts still continue to arise, the third approach is "withdrawing attention" — that is, the aspirant should "not attend", "not give attention", "be without attention and reflection", "pay no mind and pay no attention", or even "forget" such thoughts.

If the third approach fails to eliminate negative thoughts, the fourth approach involves going "to the root" (Pali: vitakka mula bheda pabbam) by "stilling the thought-formation", "removal of the (thought) source of those unskillful thoughts", "appeasing the whole intentional thought process", or engaging in "the relaxing of thought-fabrication". The sutta compares this to stages of removing the source of physical movement:

Just as a man walking fast might consider: 'Why am I walking fast? What if I walk slowly?' and he would walk slowly; then he might consider: 'Why am I walking slowly? What if I stand?' and he would stand; then he might consider: 'Why am I standing? What if I sit?' and he would sit; then he might consider: 'Why am I sitting? What if I lie down?' and he would lie down. By doing so he would substitute for each grosser posture one that was subtler. So too...when a bhikkhu gives attention to stilling the thought-formation of those thoughts...his mind becomes steadied internally, quieted, brought to singleness, and concentrated.

The fifth approach (Pali: abhinigganhitabbam; Sanskrit: abhinigrahā), to be pursued when the fourth and all previous approaches together fail to eliminate negative thoughts, is to clench the teeth and "subdue and beat down the (evil) mind by the (good) mind", just as one man may do physical violence to another man.

== Commentaries and translations ==
A commentary on the Vitakkasanthana Sutta was provided in Part III of Conquest of Mind by Eknath Easwaran (1988).

Martine Batchelor characterized the Vitakkasanthana Sutta as a discourse "which seems to illustrate an early Buddhist cognitive behavioural strategy." She provided paragraph-length commentaries on each of the 5 methods listed in the sutta, and wrote that "In the Korean Zen tradition, the Vitakkasanthana Sutta is neither taught nor even mentioned. When I first heard a vipassana teacher explain this sutta, I was particularly struck because it was an exact description of what I had found myself doing after practising Zen meditation for 10 years."

Several English translations have been done of the Vitakka-saṇṭhāna Sutta, including:

- "The Removal of Distracting Thoughts" (Soma Thera, 1960/1981),
- "The Removal of Distracting Thoughts" (Nanamoli Bhikkhu & Bhikkhu Bodhi, 2005) (as part of a translation of the entire Majjhima Nikaya)
- "The Discursively Thinking Mind" (Sister Uppalavanna) (as part of a translation of the entire Majjhima Nikaya)
- "The Relaxation of Thoughts" (Thanissaro Bhikkhu, 1997)

== See also ==
- List of Majjhima Nikaya suttas
