= Parable of the Poisoned Arrow =

Parable used in early Buddhism

The parable of the arrow (or 'Parable of the poisoned arrow') is a Buddhist parable that illustrates the skeptic and pragmatic themes of the Cūḷamālukya Sutta (The Shorter Instructions to Mālukya) which is part of the middle length discourses (Majjhima Nikaya), one of the five sections of the Sutta Pitaka in Pāli Canon. The Pāli text contains a number of hapax legomena or otherwise obscure archery terms and these are generally poorly dealt with in English translations.

== Narrative ==
The sutta begins at Jetavana where the monk Malunkyaputta is troubled by Gautama Buddha's silence on the fourteen unanswerable questions, which include queries about the nature of the cosmos and life after the death of a Buddha. Malunkyaputta then meets with Gautama Buddha and asks him for the answers to these questions, saying that if he fails to respond, Malunkya will renounce his teachings. Gautama responds by first stating that he never promised to reveal ultimate metaphysical truths such as those, and then uses the story of a man who has been shot with a poisoned arrow to illustrate that those questions are irrelevant to his teachings.

It's just as if a man were wounded with an arrow thickly smeared with poison. His friends & companions, kinsmen & relatives would provide him with a surgeon, and the man would say, 'I won't have this arrow removed until I know whether the man who wounded me was a noble warrior, a priest, a merchant, or a worker.' He would say, 'I won't have this arrow removed until I know the given name & clan name of the man who wounded me... until I know whether he was tall, medium, or short... until I know whether he was dark, ruddy-brown, or golden-colored... until I know his home village, town, or city... until I know whether the bow with which I was wounded was a long bow or a crossbow... until I know whether the bowstring with which I was wounded was fiber, bamboo threads, sinew, hemp, or bark... until I know whether the shaft with which I was wounded was wild or cultivated... until I know whether the feathers of the shaft with which I was wounded were those of a vulture, a stork, a hawk, a peacock, or another bird... until I know whether the shaft with which I was wounded was bound with the sinew of an ox, a water buffalo, a langur, or a monkey.' He would say, 'I won't have this arrow removed until I know whether the shaft with which I was wounded was that of a common arrow, a curved arrow, a barbed, a calf-toothed, or an oleander arrow.' The man would die and those things would still remain unknown to him.

== Commentary ==
Thích Nhất Hạnh comments on the way the parable of the poisoned arrow illustrates Gautama Buddha's anti-metaphysical views:

The Buddha always told his disciples not to waste their time and energy in metaphysical speculation. Whenever he was asked a metaphysical question, he remained silent. Instead, he directed his disciples toward practical efforts. Questioned one day about the problem of the infinity of the world, the Buddha said, "Whether the world is finite or infinite, limited or unlimited, the problem of your liberation remains the same." Another time he said, "Suppose a man is struck by a poisoned arrow and the doctor wishes to take out the arrow immediately. Suppose the man does not want the arrow removed until he knows who shot it, his age, his parents, and why he shot it. What would happen? If he were to wait until all these questions have been answered, the man might die first." Life is so short. It must not be spent in endless metaphysical speculation that does not bring us any closer to the truth.

Sangharakshita notes that "The important thing is to get rid of the arrow, not to enquire where it came from."

The parable is considered a teaching on being practical and dealing with the situation at hand.

== Chinese sources ==
The story is also preserved in two Chinese translations of Prakrit sources.

- 箭喻經 Jiàn yù jīng (Arrow Metaphor Sūtra), T 1.26 (p0804a21), （二二一）中阿含例品 (Èr èr yī) Zhōng ā hán, Lì pǐn. Madhyāgama 221, Chapter on Examples. Translated from an Indic language (possibly Gāndārī) into Chinese by a Sarvāstivāda Tripiṭaka master, Gautama Saṅghadeva, from Kashmir in the Eastern Jin Dynasty ca. Dec 397 – Jan 398 CE.
- 佛說箭喻經 Fú shuō jiàn yù jīng

Each of these uses different translation strategies. T 1.26 transposes the various archery terms into items and materials familiar to a Chinese audience; while T 1.94 uses transliterated Indic terms that do not match the Pāli in most cases. Thus the obscure Pāli terms remain largely obscure for now. A third Chinese text, Mahāprajñāpāramitāupadeśa (T 1509 at T XXV 170a8-b1) contains a paraphrase of this text.
