= Brahmayu =

Scholar of ancient Mithila

Brahmayu was a Brahmin, residing in Mithila and well-accoplished in the Vedic studies, who figures in the Brahmayu Sutta (MN 91). In this sutta, Brahmayu converts to Buddhism after the Buddha convinced him to listen the dharma by revealing two of the hidden marks of a Buddha, namely "his hidden genitals and enormous tongue."

In the text Brahmayu Sutta, there is a philosophical discourse between Lord Buddha and the Brahmin Brahmayu. The philosophical discourse is related to the Buddha's identity. In the philosophical discourse, Brahmayu inquired about the process of becoming Buddha. Then Lord Buddha replied the inquiry of Brahmayu in five lines.

== Sources ==
- Holt, John Clifford; Kinnard, Jacob N.; Walters, Jonathan S. (2012). Constituting Communities: Theravāda Buddhism and the Religious Cultures of South and Southeast Asia. State University of New York Press. ISBN 978-0-7914-8705-1.
- Malalasekera, George Peiris (2007). Dictionary of Pāli Proper Names. Motilal Banarsidass Publishing House. ISBN 978-81-208-3020-2.
- Powers, John (2009). A Bull of a Man: Images of Masculinity, Sex, and the Body in Indian Buddhism. Harvard University Press. ISBN 978-0-674-05443-1.
