= Sri Lankan Forest Tradition =

Buddhist tradition

Sri Lankan Forest Monks' Tradition claims a long history. As the oldest Theravada Buddhist country in the world, several forest traditions and lineages have existed, disappeared and re-emerged circularly in Sri Lanka. The current forest traditions and lineages in Sri Lanka have been influenced by the Burmese and Thai traditions which descend from the ancient Indian and Sri Lankan traditions.

== Historical background ==
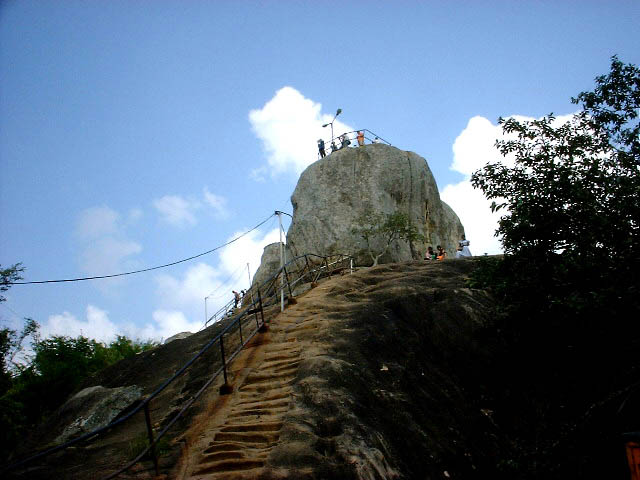
Mihintale Rock where Arahant Mahinda arrived the island and met the King Devanampiyatissa.

=== Establishment of Buddhism in Sri Lanka ===
After the era of the Indian Emperor Asoka, India lost her place as the Theravada Buddhist center of the world. It is said that emperor Asoka and his advisor monks predicted this would happen and organized a Theravada Buddhist Mission to nine countries in Asia. As a result of this mission, the great arahant Mahinda who was the son of emperor Asoka was sent to Sri Lanka in order to establish Buddha Sasana (message of the Lord Buddha) with a group consisting of six arahants called Ittiya, Uttiya, Sambala, Bhaddasala, Novice Sumana (Sumana Samanera) and anagami layman Bhanduka (Bhanduka Upasaka).

The King Devanampiya Tissa who was the king of Sri Lanka at that period met this group and accepted Buddhism and declared Buddhism as the state religion of Sri Lanka. The vice king Arittha who was the cousin of King Devanampiya Tissa was the first Buddhist monk of Sri Lanka who was called as arahant Upatissa.

One year Later the emperor Asoka decided to send another group to Sri Lanka in order to establish a Buddhist Nuns' order (Bhikkhuni order) in Sri Lanka. The leader of this group was the daughter of the emperor Asoka who was the great arahant nun Sanghmitta. In addition, eighteen groups of technical people which were dedicated for Buddhist cultural works were sent with arahant Sanghamitta in order to strengthen the established Buddhist Lineage in Sri Lanka.

=== History of Theravada Lineages ===
Since the first days of the establishment of a Theravada Buddhist Lineage in Sri Lanka, it has remained the main tradition there. After the era of the great Indian emperor Asoka, Sri Lanka was the global epicenter of the Theravada tradition. The Pali Canon (Theravada Tripitaka), which was preserved and conveyed by memorization and recitation, was first written in Sri Lanka at the Aluvihara in Matale. Almost all the early commentaries of Dhamma (Attha Katha) were written in Sri Lanka. The popular commentary writer Bhiikku Buddhaghosa was able to translate Sri Lankan commentaries which had been written in Sinhala Language into the Pali Language during the Anuradhapura era.

When other Theravada countries such as Siam (Thailand) and Ramanna (Part of Burma/Myanmar) lost their monastic lineage, Sri Lankan monks were sent to re-establish the Upasampada monks' lineage during the period of the Polonnaruwa Kingdom in Sri Lanka. Later, in the 17th century CE, the Upasampada Lineage had disappeared in Sri Lanka due to attacks and the subsequent domination of Western intruders. A novice monk, Weliwita Saranamkara, brought Upasampada from Siam (Thailand) and was able to reestablish the lineage in Sri Lanka. During the 18th century several monks were able to again bring new Upasampada lineages from Amarapura (a part of Burma/Myanmar) and Ramanna (a part of Burma/Myanmar).

Today three main Theravada Nikayas (Lineages) such as Siam Niakaya, Amarapura Nikaya, Ramanna Nikaya are dominant in Sri Lanka: Siyam Nikaya is the lineage from Siam, Amarapura Nikaya is the lineage from Amarapura and the Ramanna Nikaya is the lineage from Ramanna.

== Forest Traditions ==
=== Forest monks and monasteries ===
In the early days, the forest traditions were affiliated either with the Great Monastery Mahavihara in Anuradhapura or with other main ancient monasteries such as Mihintale, Ritigala, Dimbulagala, Situlpawwa. Many ruins and caves of ancient forest monasteries can be seen in the large forest areas of Anuradhapura, Polonnaruwa, Matale, Tissamaharama, Situlpawwa and Ruhuna and all over the island. Sri Lanka was then the center of Theravada Buddhism as well as the Theravada forest tradition in the world.

Many stories about ancient forest monks are recorded in the Pali Atthakata and Visuddhimagga. Currently the largest forest sect in Sri Lanka is the Sri Kalyani Yogashrama Samstha (Galduva Sect) of Rāmañña Nikāya of Amarapura–Rāmañña Nikāya. In addition, several other sects such as Vaturuvila, Polgasduva, Thapowana continue to have several forest monasteries.

=== Preserving Pure Upasampada ===
The validity of upasampada (high-ordination) of the monks is considered to be weaken if the monks become less respecting towards the Vinaya (monastic discipline) and Vinaya-kammas (disciplinary procedures) in Buddhist monkhood. The ordination is considered to be invalid, if the upasampada-kamma (high-ordination procedure) was not done properly according to the texts. Ancient forest monks were considered to be well aware of this and have been protecting the validity of upasampada in the main three Theravada countries up until the period of Amarapura forest monks in Burma. During the 19th century, two groups of Sri Lankan monks were considered to be borrowed the trustworthy-upasampada from Amarapura forest monks in Burma, and established the Amarapura and Ramanna Nikayas of Sri Lanka. When these two Nikayas were considered slowly becoming lax in higher Vinaya, Sri Kalyani Yogasrama Samstha was established by a group of Ramanna Nikaya monks led by Kadawedduwe Jinavamsa Maha Thera, in order to preserve the forest Vinaya lineage further.

== Notable contemporary Forest Tradition monks ==
=== Ambagahawatte Indrasabhawara Gnanasami Maha Thera ===
Founder of Sri Lanka Ramanna Maha Nikaya in 1864 by bringing pure Upasampada from Ratnapunna Vihara in Burma and joining with group of monks who brought pure Upasampada from Kalyani Sima in Burma and from Dhammayut Nikaya in Thailand. His intention was to re-establish a pure Vinaya lineage in Sri Lanka.

=== Puwakdandawe Paññānanda Maha Thera ===
Brought pure Upasampada from Kalyani Sima of Burma and joined with the Ambagahawatte Indrasabhawara Gnanasami Maha Thera in order to establish Sri Lanka Ramanna Maha Nikaya. He was considered the pioneer of forest dwellers in Sri Lanka Ramanna Maha Nikaya. Some of his lineage's successor monks joined Sri Kalyani Yogasrama Samstha and some of them remain in Delduva sect of Sri Lanka Ramanna Maha Nikaya.

=== Vaturuvila Gnanananda MahaThera ===
Founder monk of Vaturuvila Vanavasa sect of Siyam Nikaya.

=== Kadawedduwe Jinavamsa Maha Thera ===
Being the founder of Sri Kalyani Yogasrama Samstha in 1951 as a reform movement during the Buddha Jayanti (B.E. 2500) festival years, his intention has been to protect the pure Vinaya lineage in Sri Lanka.

=== Matara Sri Nanarama Maha Thera ===
Matara Sri Nanarama Mahathera, who is considered to be the father of the Sri Lankan modern forest meditation tradition, was a researcher of old Sri Lankan vipassana meditation methods and has been influenced by Burmese Mahasi Vipassana Method. Nauyane Ariyadhamma Maha Thera, Hikkaduve Dhammasila Mahathera, Migoda Sanghsobhana Maha Thera and the Greek Nyanadassana Mahathera (Ioannis Tselios) are several of his close students.

=== Matale Silarakkhita Maha Thera ===
The founder of Ruwangirikanda forest monastery who later joined with Sri Kalyani Yogasrama Samstha. Natagane forest monastery and Budugallena forest monastery were re-established under Silarakkhita Maha Thera.

=== Madawala Dhammatilaka Maha Thera ===
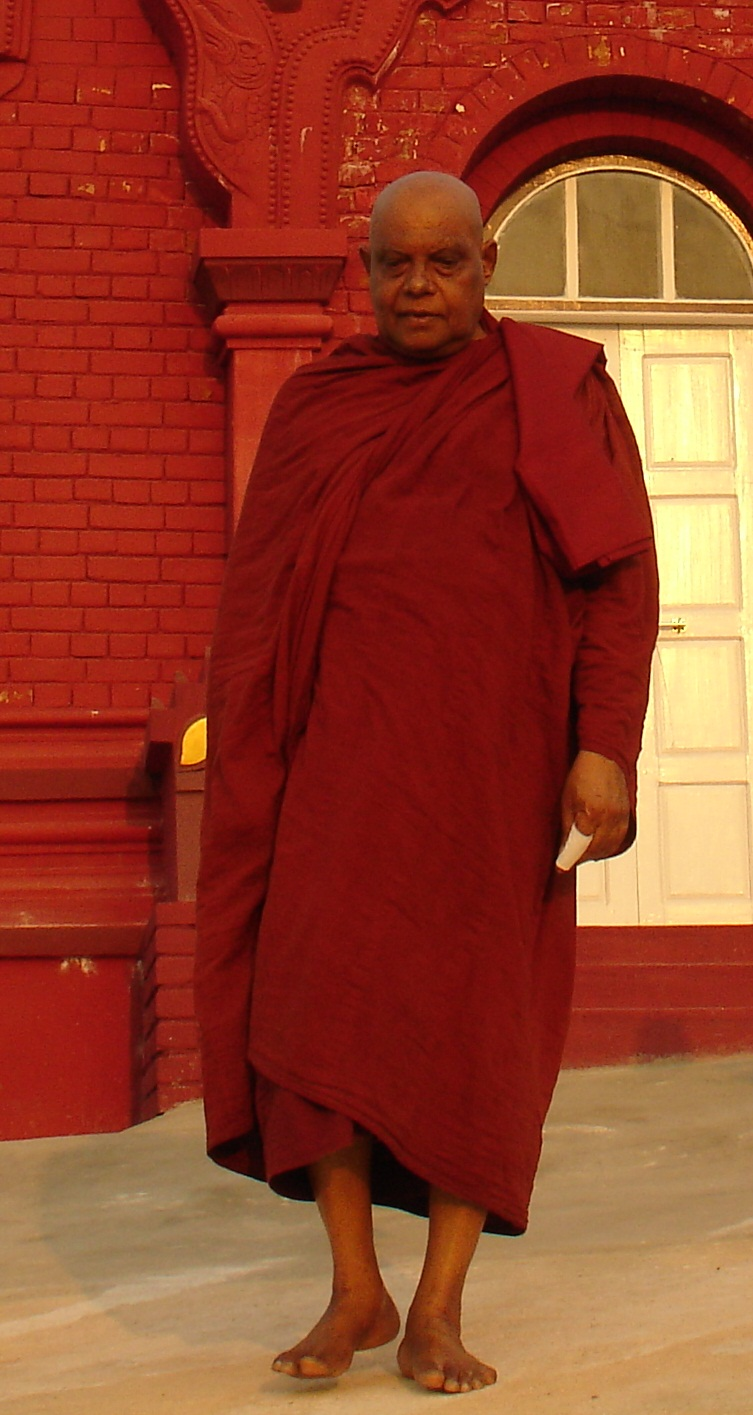
Most Venerable Nauyane Ariyadhamma Mahathera

The first abbot of Nimalawa forest monastery after joining with Sri Kalyani Yogasrama Samstha.

=== Nauyane Ariyadhamma Maha Thera ===
A student of Kadawedduwe Jinavamsa Maha Thera, who was believed to possess exceptional memory and restraint.

=== Welimada Dhammadassi Maha Thera ===
A student of Kadawedduwe Jinavamsa Maha Thera and Matara Sri Nanarama Maha Thera who is the current abbot of the Nimalawa forest monastery.

=== Hikkaduwe Dhammasila Maha Thera ===
A student of Kadawedduwe Jinavamsa Maha Thera and Matara Sri Nanarama Maha Thera who compiled the Vinaya manual of Sri Kalyani Yogasrama Samstha and is the current abbot of the Beralihela Forest Monastery.

=== Nyanadassana Maha Thera ===
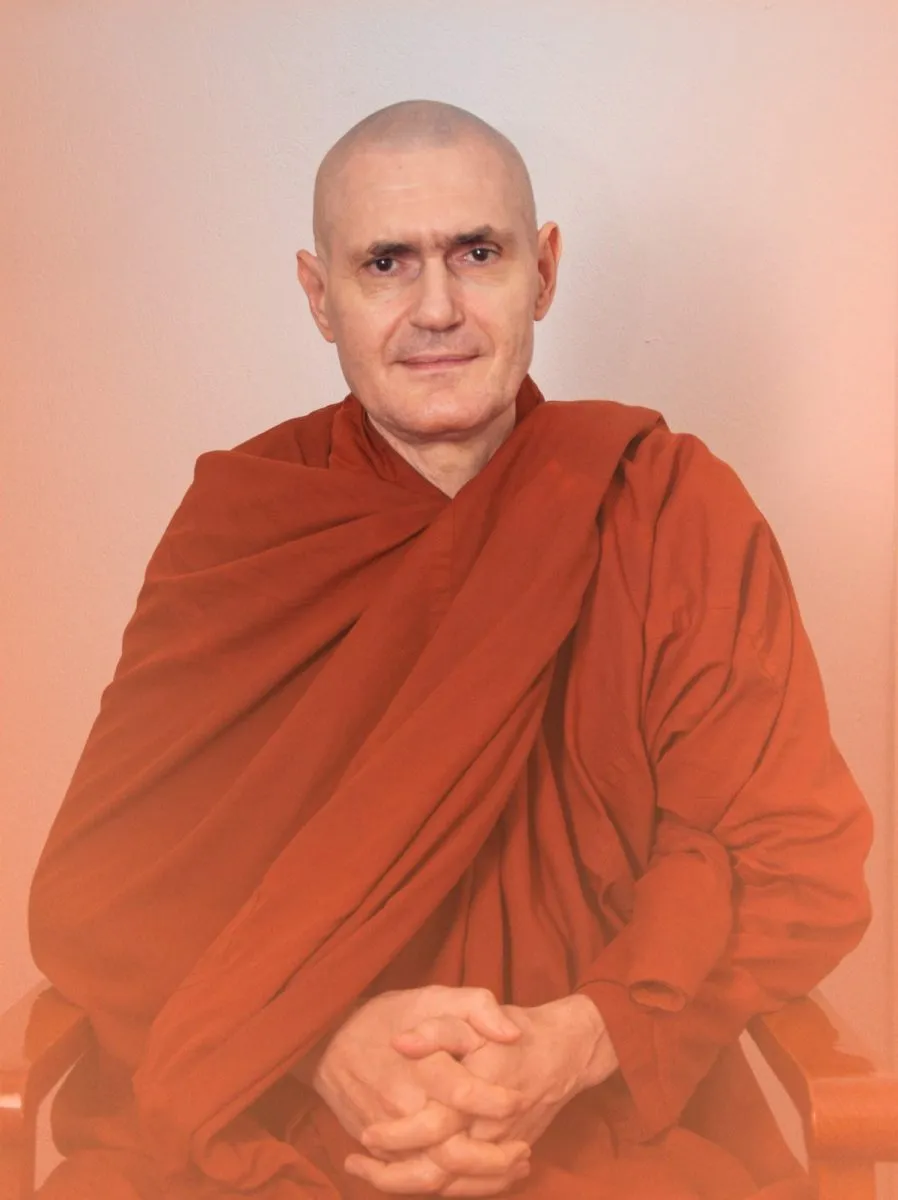
Nyānadassana Mahāthera

Bhikkhu Nyānadassana Mahāthera, born Ioannis Tselios in 1959 in Greece, is a Theravāda Buddhist monk, scholar, and teacher. He initially pursued sociology at Goethe University in Frankfurt but left before completing his studies. In 1981, he traveled through South Asia, visiting key Buddhist sites in India and eventually arriving in Sri Lanka, where he received novice ordination in 1982. He later attained full ordination as a bhikkhu in 1986 under the guidance of Kaḍaveddūve Shrī Jinavaṁsa Mahāthera.

For sixteen years, he dedicated himself to the study of Pali, the Tipiṭaka (Buddhist scriptures), and commentarial texts at the Gnānārāma Dharmāyatanaya monastery in Mītirigala. He earned the title of Vinayācariya (Teacher of Monastic Discipline) in 1997 and subsequently taught Pali and the Tipiṭaka. Alongside his scholarly activities, he engaged in intensive meditation, practicing Vipassanā (insight meditation) and Samatha (concentration meditation) under various teachers, including Venerable Mātara Sri Ñāṇārāma Mahāthera in Sri Lanka and Pa-Auk Sayadaw in Myanmar.

Between 2008 and 2018, he traveled extensively, conducting Dhamma talks and meditation classes in Singapore, Indonesia, Malaysia, and Taiwan. From 2011 to 2019, he resided at Nā Uyana Forest Monastery in Sri Lanka, continuing his monastic and teaching activities. In 2019, he returned to Greece, by invitation from Michael Xynos, director of Theravada Center in Greece and Honorary Consul of Sri Lanka, to teach Theravāda Buddhism. There, he offered courses in Buddhist philosophy and psychology, as well as meditation seminars both in person and online. He has also authored several books, including Meditation: Liberation or Attachment and The Historical Buddha and His Teaching.

== Contemporary forest monasteries ==
Some of the widely known forest monasteries, among the large number of monasteries scattered throughout the island are listed below.

=== Sri Kalyani Yogasrama Samstha(Galduwa Chapter) ===
The famous monasteries associated with the Sri Kalayani Yogasrama Samstha are listed below.

- Galduwa Forest Monastery: It is the headquarters of this chapter.
- Nimalawa Forest Monastery: One of the ancient forest monasteries where the arahant Dhammadinna was considered to be resided. It was re-established as the first forest monastery of Sri Kalyani Yogasrama Samstha in 1951 by Kadawedduwe Jinavamsa Maha Thera.
- Na Uyana Forest Monastery: Na Uyana Aranya is situated in the North Western Province and affiliated to Sri Kalyani Yogasrama Samstha and Pa-Auk Forest Monastery in Myanmar.
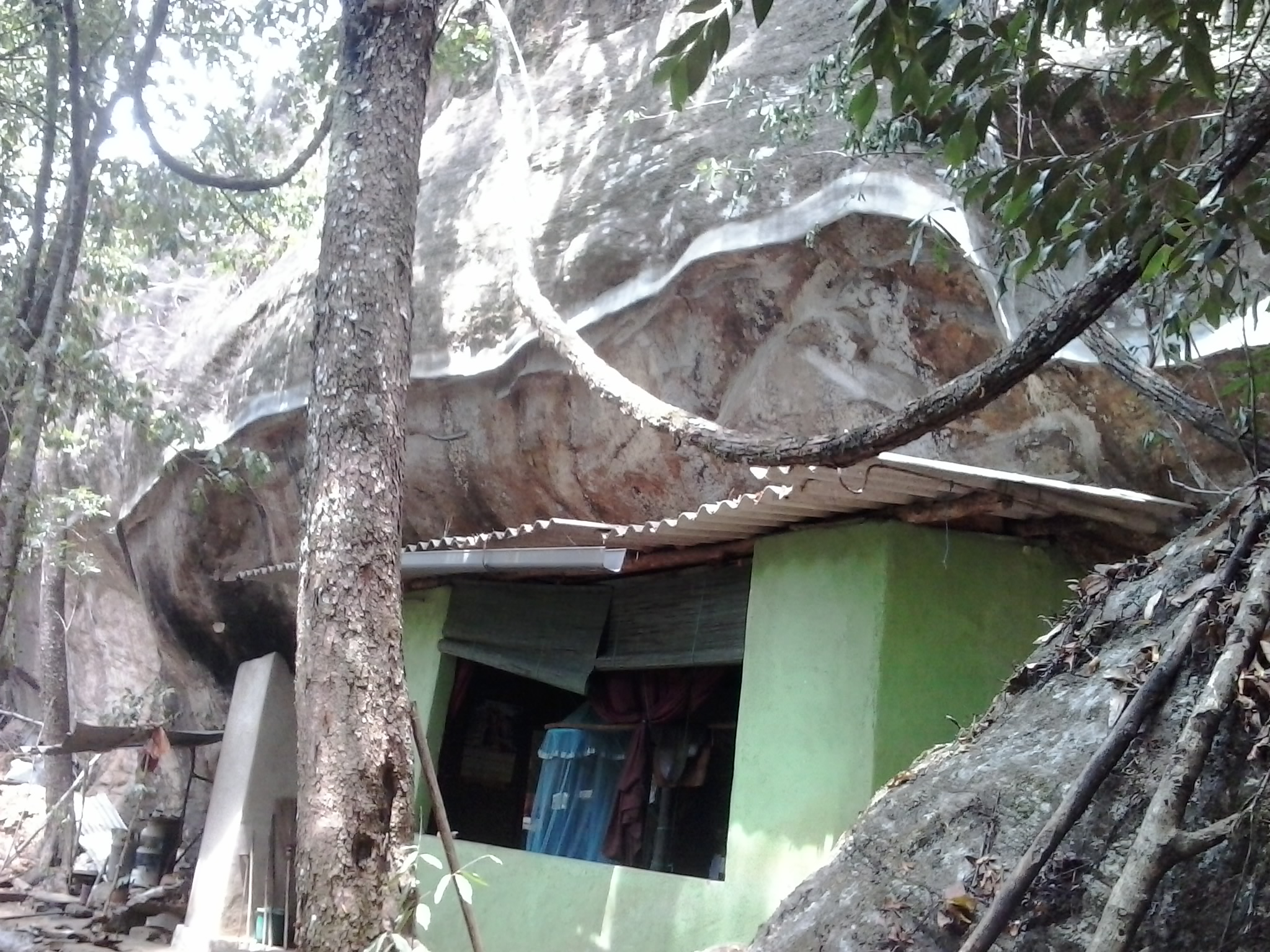
- A cave in Tanjantenna
  Tanjantenna Forest and Monastery: A group of isolated caves and huts scattered throughout Balangoda forest areas in which both local and foreign monks reside and practice meditation. Bhaddekavihari Forest Monastery which serves as the central meeting place, sick ward and the Uposatha sima for the local and foreign monks dwell in nearby forests, is considered to be the central meeting place of the dwelling monks. Affiliated to Sri Kalyani Yogasrama Samstha.
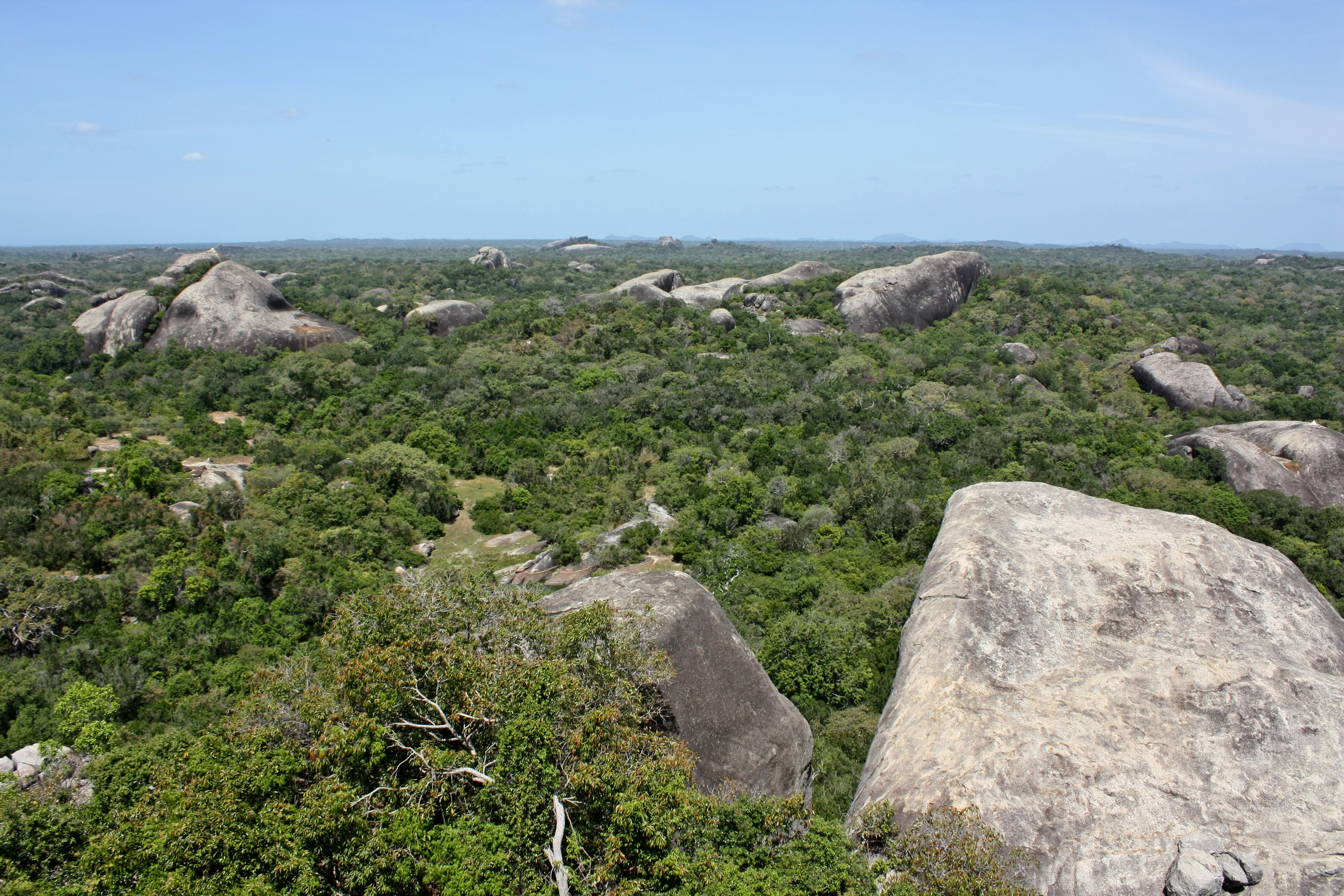
- Kudumbigala monastery complex
  Kudumbigala Forest Monastery: An ancient monastery in Kumana forest sanctuary which is famous for its isolated environment and beautiful landscapes which was re-established by late Thambugala Anandasiri Mahathera.

=== Other Monasteric Groups ===
Some other common types of forest monasteric traditions are listed below.

- Thapowana Forest Monastery Tradition: Thapowana means Meditation Forest. The headquarters is Rajagiriya, near Colombo. The head monk of the Tapovana tradition was elected as the 4th Supreme Patriarch of the Amarapura Nikaya. He died in 2023. Mhintale Kalu Diya Pokuna Thapowanaya, Kagalla Thapowanaya are some of them.
- Wathuruwila Forest Monasteric Sect
- Vajirāma Tradition
- The Kanduboda group
- Delduwa Group
- Arisimale Group
