= Nissarana Vanaya Meditation System =

The Nissarana Vanaya Meditation System was developed by Matara Sri Ñāṇārāma Mahathera, the first Upajjhaya of Sri Kalyani Yogasrama Samstha. This Buddhist meditation system uses samatha and vipassanā techniques in combination to allow what it claims are more intense insight results than ‘dry insight’ meditation. It was refined over decades by the head monks of the Nissarana Vanaya.

== History ==
In the 1960s, after the sixth Buddhist council had given Mahasi Sayadaw an eminent role in the Buddhist meditation revival, he was invited by the Sri Lankan government to train, teach and help establish vipassana meditation centers in Sri Lanka. At that time a group of meditation monks received the opportunity to privately train and practice with Mahasi Sayadaw. Among those was the Matara Sri Ñāṇārāma Mahathera.

Mahasi Sayadaw made him the main vipassana teacher after his departure and a friend of Matara Sri Ñāṇanārāma Mahathera invited him to lead the training facility for meditation in a newly founded association of forest monasteries, the Nissarana Vanaya.

Over the years Ñāṇārāma Mahathera added instructions to the Burmese system. One of the fundamental additions was a greater emphasis on concentration meditation as well as a carefully designed set of standardized instructions which helped newly ordained forest monks to methodically develop their concentration and insight faculties.

During this time Ñāṇārāma Mahathera published two books on insight meditation: The seven stages of purification and The seven contemplations. In the late 1980s, one of his foremost students, a former lecturer for Pali, the Katukurunde Ñāṇananda held 33 discourses on the topic Nibbana.

Many meditation teachers visited the monastery during this time (Ayya Khema) or were influenced by its meditation methodologies.

During the last decade of Ñāṇārāma Mahathera's life the meditation system was refined in its approach towards labeling and noting in vipassana meditation. The amount of labels was reduced, the importance of concentration meditation intensified.

Currently this system is taught in many of Sri Lankan forest monasteries which were influenced by Ñāṇārāma Mahathera.

== Followers ==
Famous meditation teachers who were trained in this system or variants thereof include:

- Ayya Khema
- Bhikkhu Ñāṇananda
- Nauyane Ariyadhamma Mahathera
- Balangoda Ananda Maitreya Thero
- Bhikkhu Dhammajīva, current abbot of the Nissarana Vanaya forest hermitage
- Mitra Wettimuny, a famous Sri Lankan lay meditation instructor
- Amatagavesi, a famous Sri Lankan meditation teacher
- Pannyavaro
- Several Western students now teaching in Great Britain, the US and Sri Lanka
