= Nyanadassana Mahathera =

Greek Buddhist monk

Bhikkhu Nyānadassana Mahāthera
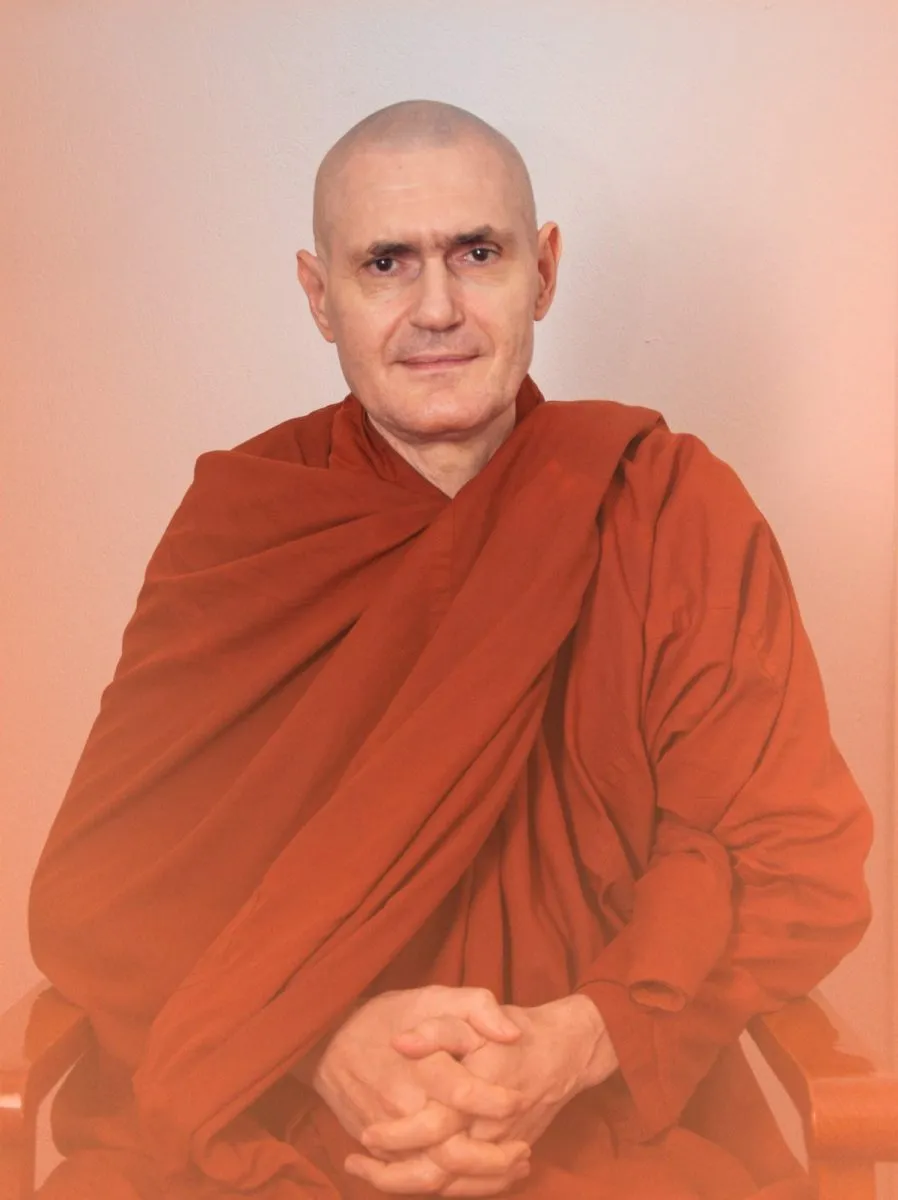
- Nyānadassana Mahāthera in 2019
- Title: Bhikkhu

Personal life
- Born: Ioannis Tselios (Ιωάννης Τσέλιος); February 21, 1959 (age 67) Serres, Greece

Religious life
- Religion: Buddhism
- Order: Śrī Kalyāṇī Yogāśrama Saṃsthā of Rāmañña Nikāya
- School: Theravāda
- Ordination: 1982 (novice ordination); 1986 (full ordination as a bhikkhu)

Senior posting
- Teacher: Kaḍaveddūve Shrī Jinavaṁsa Mahāthera; Most Ven. Mātara Sri Ñānārāma Mahāthera

Bhikkhu Nyānadassana Mahāthera (born 1959, Serres) is a Theravāda Greek Buddhist monk, scholar, and teacher.

== Early life and education ==
Bhikkhu Nyānadassana Mahāthera was born Ioannis Tselios (Greek: Ιωάννης Τσέλιος) in 1959 in Karperi, Serres, Greece, and completed his high school education in Thessaloniki. He studied sociology at the Goethe University in Frankfurt, Germany for two years but left before completing his degree.

Ioannis Tselios traveled around South Asia during the 1980s. He first went to India in 1981 and visited key Buddhist sites, including Kushinagar and Lumbini. Later on, he traveled to Sri Lanka.

== Monastic life ==
In 1982, Ioannis Tselios received novice ordination (sāmaṇera) in Sri Lanka at the Polgasduwa Island Hermitage, where he was given the monastic name Nyānadassana, meaning "knowledge and vision." A month later, he renewed his novice ordination at Galduwa, with Kaḍaveddūve Shrī Jinavaṁsa Mahāthera officiating as his preceptor. In 1986, he was fully ordained as a bhikkhu under the same preceptor.

For sixteen years, he studied Pali, the Tipiṭaka (Buddhist Triple Canon), and commentarial literature at the Gnānārāma Dharmāyatanaya monastery in Mītirigala. In 1997, he earned the title of Vinayācariya (Teacher of Monastic Discipline) after completing rigorous examinations. Inspired by his teacher, he began teaching the Pāḷi language and the Tipiṭaka for several years.

== Meditation ==
Nyānadassana has devoted decades to meditative practices, including Vipassanā (insight meditation) and Samatha (concentration meditation). He practised at Nissaraṇa Vanaya in Mītirigala, Sri Lanka, under the guidance of the renowned meditation teacher Venerable Mātara Sri Ñāṇārāma Mahāthera. and spent over three years at the Pa-Auk Meditation Centre in Myanmar, receiving training under Pa-Auk Sayadaw.Between 2008 and 2018, he was regularly invited by Buddhist centres in Singapore, Indonesia, Malaysia, and Taiwan to deliver Dhamma talks and meditation classes. From 2011 to 2019, he resided at Nā Uyana Forest Monastery and International Meditation Centre in Kurunegala, Sri Lanka.

== Return to Greece ==
In 2019, Nyānadassana Mahāthera received an invitation to teach Theravāda Buddhism in Greece from Michail Xynos, who at the time was directing the Theravada Centre for Study and Practice in Greece. From 2019 until 2025, he conducted extensive courses in Buddhist philosophy and psychology in Greek, along with live and online meditation seminars for Greek, Sri Lankan, European, and Asian audiences.

During this period, he authored several books.

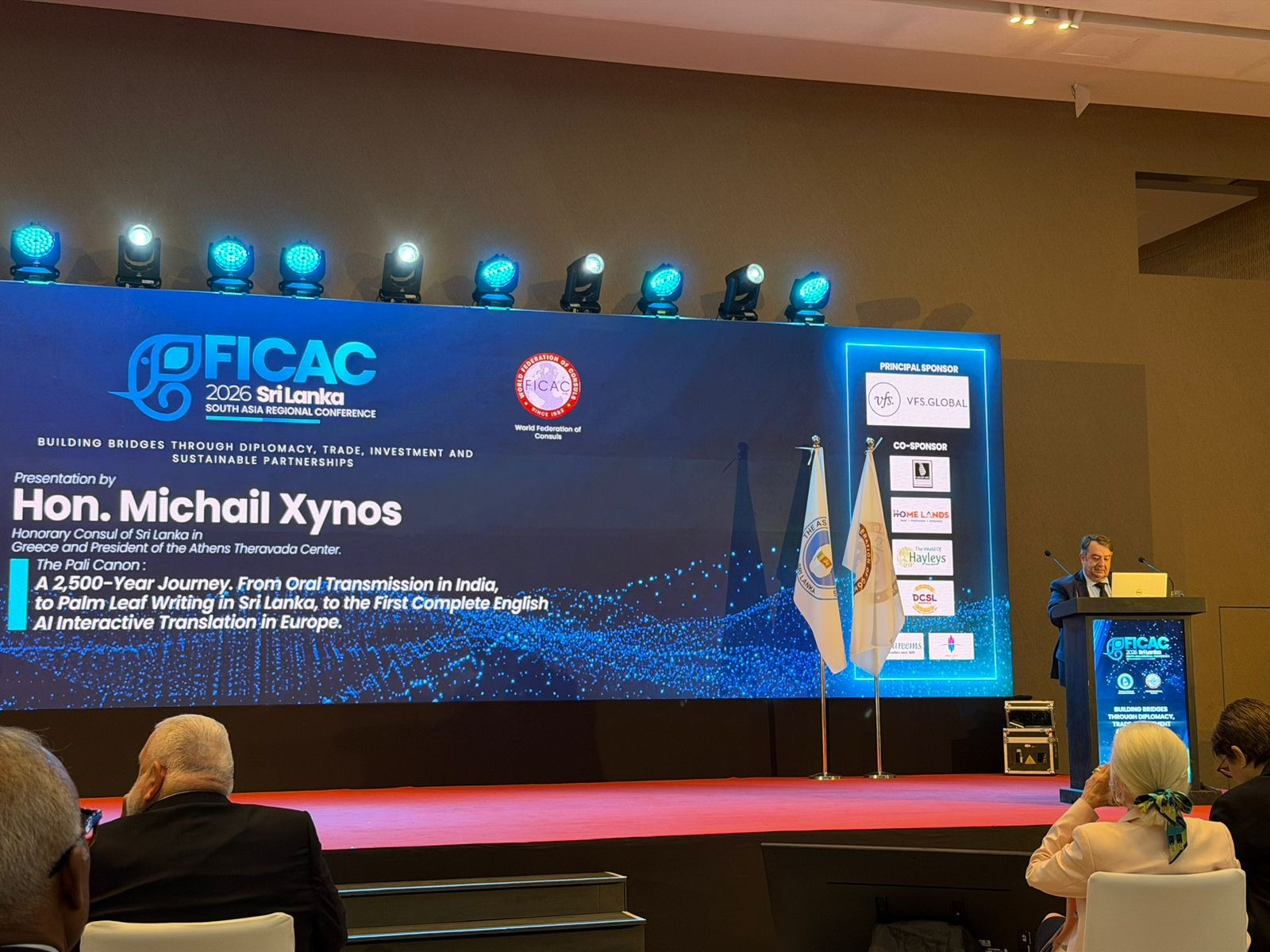
PaliVerse presentation at FICAC Conference, February 2026, by the Hon. Consul of Sri Lanka in Greece, Michael Xynos

== PaliVerse Project ==
Ñāṇadassana Mahāthera served as the primary spiritual inspiration for PaliVerse, an AI-assisted platform initiated in 2024 to produce the first complete English translation of the Pali Canon, including the Tipiṭaka, commentaries (Aṭṭhakathā), sub-commentaries (Ṭīkā), and related texts — a corpus of approximately 10 million words.

The project was founded by Michael Xynos, the President of Athens Vihara, and Honorary Consul of Sri Lanka in Greece, who credited his six years of study under Ñāṇadassana in Athens (2019–2025) as the formative experience behind the undertaking. Prior to PaliVerse, no complete English translation of the full canonical corpus had been achieved despite over 150 years of scholarly effort by institutions including the Pali Text Society.

Ñāṇadassana contributed directly to the project's translation methodology. His prior terminology work formed the foundation of the master glossary used across the platform, to which he added translation of key Pali terms into both English and Greek. Where his translations of a given term overlapped with those of the Concise Pali-English Dictionary (Buddhadatta Mahāthera), preference was given to his rendering.

== Publications ==
Nyānadassana Mahāthera has authored and translated numerous works in multiple languages, including English, German, Greek, and Sinhala. His publications include:

- Wisdom and the Seventy-Three Kinds of Mundane and Supramundane Knowledge (2003)
- Karaṇīya Metta-sutta — The Message of Peace and Universal Friendliness (2010)
- Ratana Sutta — The Buddha's Discourse on The Three Superb Jewels and Their Intrinsic Power (2011)
- When is Dawn (aruṇa)? When is Dawnrise (aruṇuggamana)? (2013)
- Mode of Veneration of the Buddha (2016)
- Bhikkhu-Pātimokkha — Das Hauptregelwerk der Buddhistischen Mönche (2008) (a German translation and explanation of the monastic code)
- Meditation: Liberation or Attachment (2025), ISBN 978-618-86185-3-4
- The Historical Buddha and His Teaching (2025), ISBN 978-618-86185-5-8

Greek books

- Διαλογισμός: Απελευθέρωση ή Προσκόλληση (2025), ISBN 978-618-86185-1-0
- Ο Ιστορικός Βούδας και η Διδασκαλία του (2025), ISBN 978-618-86185-4-1

Greek translations

- Karaṇīya Metta-sutta — Το Μήνυμα της Ειρήνης και της Παγκόσμιας Φιλικότητας (2020)
- Αυτά που ο Βούδας Δίδαξε (2022), ISBN 978-618-86185-0-3 (a translation of What the Buddha Taught by Walpola Rahula)
- Dhammapada, Η Σοφή Διδασκαλία του Βούδα σε Στίχους (2024), ISBN 978-618-86185-2-7
