= Kadawedduwe Jinavamsa Mahathera =

Sri Lankan Buddhist monk and founder of Galduwa Forest Tradition

Most Ven. Kadawedduwe Jinavaṃsa Maha Thera
- Title: Śrī Āryavilāsa Vaṃsālaṇkāra Saddharmavāgīśvarācārya, Mahopādhyāya, Paṭipatti Sobhana Gaṇapāmokkhācariya, Maha Thera

Personal life
- Born: Don Dinesh; 1 April 1907 Kadawedduwa, Matara
- Died: 13 July 2003 (aged 96) Galduva Aranya, Kahawa, Ambalangoda

Religious life
- Religion: Buddhism
- School: Theravada
- Sect: Ramanna Nikaya; Sri Kalyani Yogasrama Samstha
- Ordination: 1921

Senior posting
- Teacher: Most Venerable Kekanadure Arya Vilasa Maha Thera
- Students: Most Ven. Nauyane Ariyadhamma Mahathera

Most Ven. Kaḍaveddūve Shrī Jinavaṁsa Mahāthera (1 April 1907 – 13 July 2003) (Pali: Siri Jinavaṃsa, sometimes spelled Jinawansa, Sinhala: අති පූජ්‍ය කඩවැද්දූවේ ශ්‍රී ජිනවංශ මහා ථේර) was a Sri Lankan (Sinhalese) Bhikkhu (Buddhist monk). He was the founder of Sri Kalyani Yogasrama Samstha, a reform movement within the Sri Lankan Rāmañña Nikāya.

== Early life ==
Ven. Jinavamsa Mahathera was born Don Dinesh on 1 April 1907 in the Kadawedduwa village in Matara. He was the fourth and youngest child in the family. Don Dinesh had his primary education at the Yatiyana Vernacular School.

When Dinesh was 10 years old, he was invited to stay and attend upon Ven. Kadawedduwe Siri Sugunatissa Mahathera, the elder brother of Dinesh's father and the abbot of Srivardhanaramaya, a temple in Yatawara. There, Dinesh learnt Pali and Sanskrit from the Ven. Kothmale Siri Saddhammavamsa Mahathera. In 1921, at the age of 14, Don Dinesh received Pabbajja with the name Kadawedduwe Jinavamsa, with Ven. Sugunatissa Mahathera as his Upajjhaya. In 1927, at the age of 20, Ven. Jinavamsa received Upasampada, with Ven. Sri Ñāṇindasabha Mahathera as his preceptor.

== Monastic career ==
In 1932, Ven. Jinavamsa founded the Granthakara Pirivena with 5 students. Later it was registered as a grant aided Pirivena under the Government on the recommendation of C. W. W. Kannangara. Ven. Jinavamsa obtained the monastic degree 'Rajakeeya Panditha' in 1945, and was awarded honorary membership of the Oriental Languages Society in 1946.

Ven. Jinavamsa Mahathera left the Granthakara Pirivena and adopted a life of a forest monk in 1950. He was accompanied by Ven. Gatamanne Vimalavamsa Thera, one of his closest disciples. With the Ven. Matara Sri Nanarama Mahathera as the chief preceptor, Ven. Jinavamsa Mahathera founded the Sri Kalyani Yogasrama Samstha on 18 June 1951, and 12 lay aspirants were given the ‘going forth’ in the new organisation on this date. The main Ramanna Nikaya gave permission to the Yogasrama Samstha to manage its own administration and conduct its own Upasampada.

During the early years of the Yogasrama Samstha, Ven. Jinavamsa Mahathera travelled throughout the network of forest monasteries, which numbered around 150. Later, he settled down at the Gunawardena Yogasrama in Galduva, Ambalangoda, and made it the organisation's headquarters. Ven. Nauyane Ariyadhamma Mahathera was his foremost student and closely assisted him in teaching and administrative duties. Another prominent student of his was Nyanadassana Mahathera, author of about twenty books. One of the books was When is Dawn (aruṇa)? When is Dawnrise (aruṇuggamana)?, an essential research book on monastic practice, which was adopted by the forest monasteries in Sri Lanka.

On 11 July 2003, two days before he died, Ven. Jinavamsa Mahathera called all his students in the monastery to his residence and gave a Dhamma talk, in which he mentioned that he would not last more than two days. On 13 July 2003, an Uposatha day, he died peacefully.

== Awards ==
The Sri Lanka Ramanna Nikaya awarded Ven. Jinavamsa Mahathera the titles of 'Śrī Āryavilāsa Vaṃsālaṇkāra Saddharmavāgīśvarācārya' and 'Mahopādhyāya'. The Sri Lanka Amarapura Maha Sangha Sabha awarded the honorary title of 'Paṭipatti Sobhana Gaṇapāmokkhācariya', appreciating his service to the Sasana. Ven. Jinavamsa Mahathera was invited to be the head of the Ramanna Nikaya when the post fell vacant, but he politely refused.

== See also ==
- Nauyane Ariyadhamma Mahathera
- Sri Kalyani Yogasrama Samstha
