= Loluwagoda =

- Country: Sri Lanka
- Province: Western Province
- District: Gampaha

Loluwagoda is a village in the Gampaha District, Sri Lanka. It is located on the Nittambuwa - Giriulla 221 main road, between the towns of Mirigama and Giriulla.

The villages that surround it include: Godakalana, Niyandagala, Giriullagama, Thalahena, Harakahawa, Kandangamuwa, Delwala, Dambuwa, Kithalawalana and Nalla.

The main religion of the people in the village is Theravada Buddhism. The old Ramanna Nikaya temple in the village (Sri Mahendraramaya) was well known among Buddhist monks in the area as a hidden and quiet temple which is not promoting social services or festivals in order to obtain donations. A group from the villagers annually donate medicine to the Mitirigala Nissarana Vanaya with a group from Atambe village.

Like the most villages in Gampaha district, the population in this area is increasing with the value of the land which has not yet encountered any considerable environmental disaster. Though several industrial factories have been established in Loluwagoda area including an export processing zone, it is still considered to be a secure and attractive area to live in.
