= Wat Pa Pao, Mueang Chiang Mai =

Buddhist temple in Chiang Mai, Thailand

Coordinates: 18°47′46″N 98°59′23″E

Wat Pa Pao
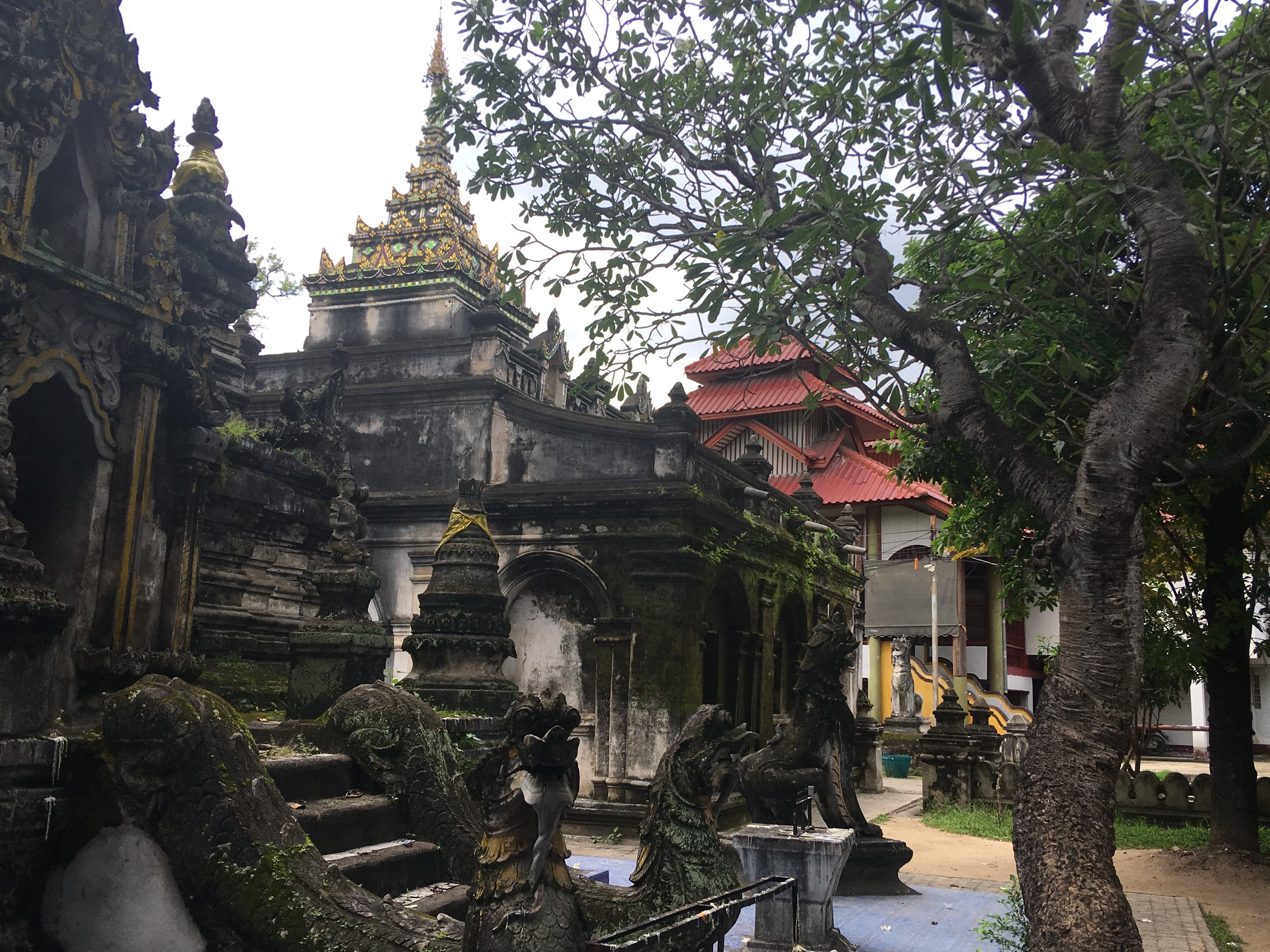

Religion
- Affiliation: Buddhism
- Sect: Therevada Buddhism
- Festival: Poy Sang Long

Location
- Location: 58 Manee Nopparat Road, Mueang Chiang Mai district, Chiang Mai
- Country: Thailand
- Interactive map of Wat Pa Pao

Architecture
- Style: Burmese-Shan
- Founder: Inthawichayanon, the 7th ruler of Chiang Mai
- Completed: 1883

Wat Pa Pao is a Buddhist temple in Chiang Mai, northern Thailand. Situated at the north-east corner of the old city next to the moat, it was the first temple in Chiang Mai to be built for the Shan community.

== History ==
Wat Pa Pao, which takes its name from a grove of pao trees in which the temple was built ("pa" meaning "forest"), was established in 1883 and was the first temple built in Chiang Mai to serve the Shan community, many of whom had migrated from the Shan States in northeastern Burma to work in the teak logging industry, and were without a place to practice their form of Buddhist worship. It was founded by Inthawichayanon, the 7th ruler of Chiang Mai, and Mom Bualai, who was his Shan consort, together with members of the Shan community.

== Description ==
The temple is known for its distinctive chedi and two assembly halls built in the Burmese-Shan architectural style. The bell-shaped chedi, mounted on a triple-tiered square base, is surmounted by a golden spire and hti, and is decorated with four qilin, mythical creatures with a lion's body and a dragon's head, at each corner. In the courtyard is an assembly hall with a seven tier, Burmese style pyatthat roof rising over its eastern end surmounted by a hti. To the west of the chedi is another assembly hall constructed mostly of teak with a striking multi-tiered zeitawun wooden roof, highly decorated with friezes and dyed red, and depicting stylised scenes of Mount Meru. The temple has a Thai Ping style Buddha image dated 1487, while many of the temple's Buddha images have distinctive Shan or Burmese characteristics.

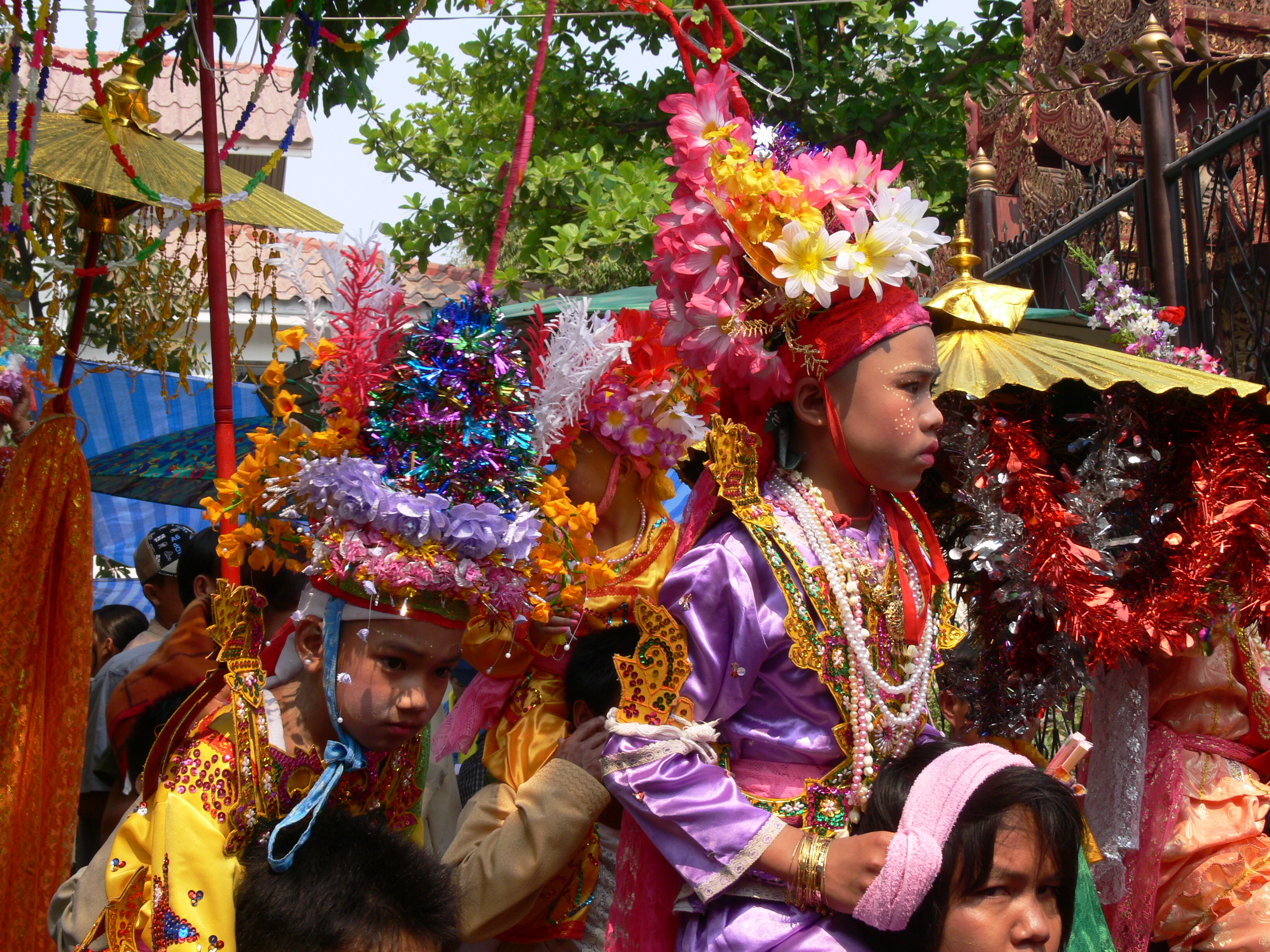
The Poy Sang Long festival in Chiang Mai

The temple is the site of the annual Poy Sang Long festival when boys are inducted as novice monks. Taking place in April and lasting for three days, it features a procession of Shan people in traditional clothing who parade through the city. Functioning as a community centre for the Shan community, the temple also provides schooling for children in the Shan dialect.
