= Shaila Catherine =

American Buddhist meditation teacher and author

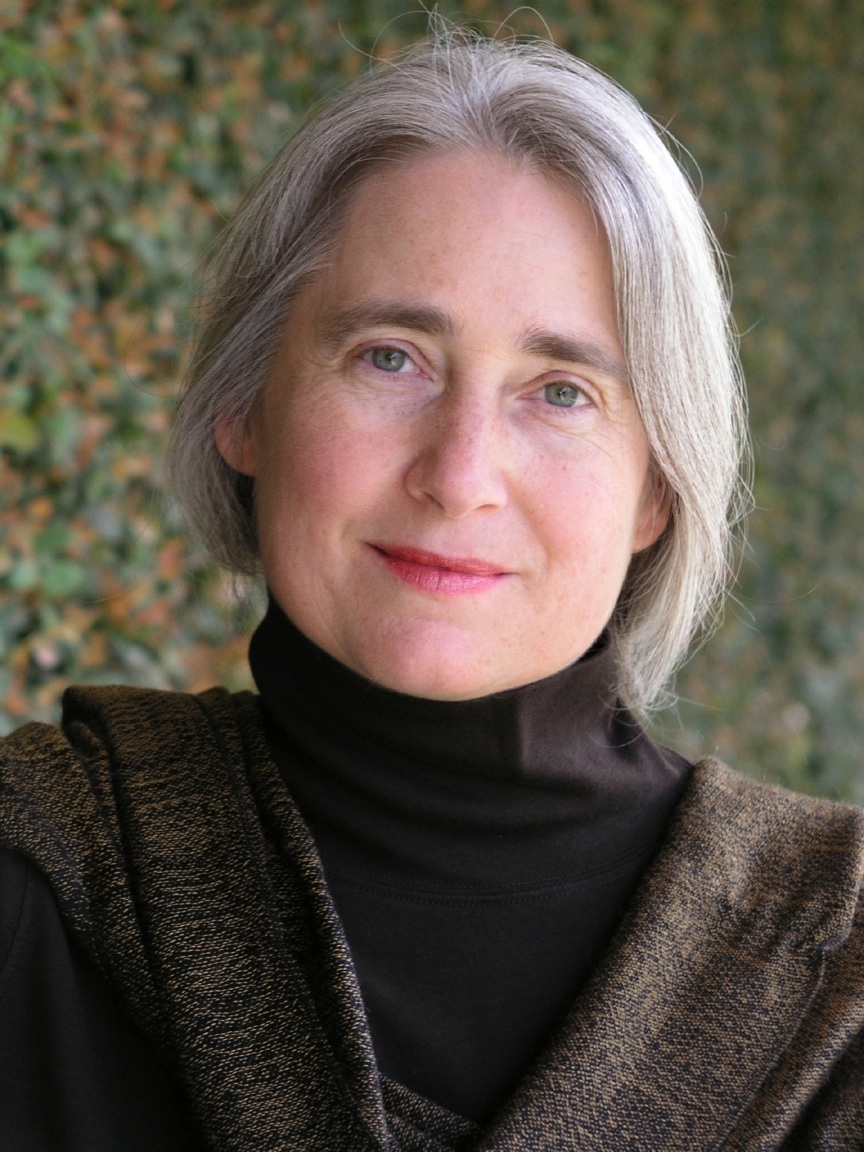
- Occupations: author, meditation teacher

Shaila Catherine is an American Buddhist meditation teacher and author in the Theravādin tradition, known for her expertise in insight meditation (vipassanā) and jhāna practices. She has authored three books on jhāna practice and has introduced many American practitioners to this concentration practice through her writings and focused retreats.

Catherine is the founder of Insight Meditation South Bay in Mountain View, California, and the primary teacher for Bodhi Courses, an online Buddhist classroom. She conducts retreats locally, nationally and internationally in mindfulness (satī), concentration (samādhi and jhāna), lovingkindness (mettā), and insight meditation (vipassanā).

== Biography ==
Shaila Catherine began meditating in 1980 in California. She later travelled and studied in Asia, training and practicing with an Advaita Vedanta master, H.W.L. Poonja, in northern India; Tibetan Dzogchen masters Tulku Urgyen Rinpoche and Nyoshul Khen Rinpoche in Nepal; and at Theravādin forest monasteries in Thailand.

In addition to these Asian masters, she has studied with founders of Western meditation centers (Christopher Titmuss, Joseph Goldstein, Sharon Salzberg, and Lama Surya Das).

Catherine developed a special interest in the practice of deep concentration, and in 2003–2004 devoted a one-year silent meditation retreat to exploring jhāna as the basis for insight. Based upon her experiences in this retreat, she wrote Focused and Fearless, as an introduction to the absorption states of jhāna.

In 2006, she began training under the guidance of the Burmese meditation master Venerable Pa Auk Sayadaw. In 2011 Catherine authored a second book, Wisdom Wide and Deep, which provides an introduction to the comprehensive practices of samādhi and vipassanā based on her training with Pa Auk Sayadaw and derived from teachings in the early Discourses of the Buddha, Visuddhimagga, and Abhidhamma.

Catherine's writings and teaching have contributed to a new and growing field within Theravādin Buddhism—introducing the traditional trainings of jhāna and insight meditation (vipassanā) to Western lay practitioners.

== Bibliography ==
- Catherine, Shaila. Wisdom Wide and Deep: A Practical Handbook for Mastering Jhanā and Vipassanā, Boston: Wisdom Publications, 2011. ISBN 978-0-86171-623-4
- Catherine, Shaila. Beyond Distraction: Five Practical Ways to Focus the Mind, Boston: Wisdom Publications, 2022. ISBN 978-1-61429-787-1
- Catherine, Shaila. The Jhanas: A Practical Guide to Deep Meditative States, Boston: Wisdom Publications, 2024 ISBN 978-1614299462 (Previously published as Focused and Fearless: A Meditator’s Guide to States of Deep Joy, Calm and Clarity, Boston: Wisdom Publications, 2008. ISBN 978-0-86171-560-2)

== Audio publications ==
- DharmaSeed
- Audiodharma

== Interviews ==
- When Students Get Distracted
- How To Focus
- Jhana and the Practice of True Happiness
- Settle into the Bliss
- Focused and Fearless with the Jhanas
- The Way of Commitment
- Concentrating the Hell Out of Mind: Jhana Interviews with four experts
