= Nauyane Ariyadhamma Mahathera =

Sri Lankan Buddhist monk and meditation master

Most Venerable Nauyane Ariyadhamma Mahāthēra අතිපූජ්‍යය නා උයනේ අරියධම්ම මහා ථේර
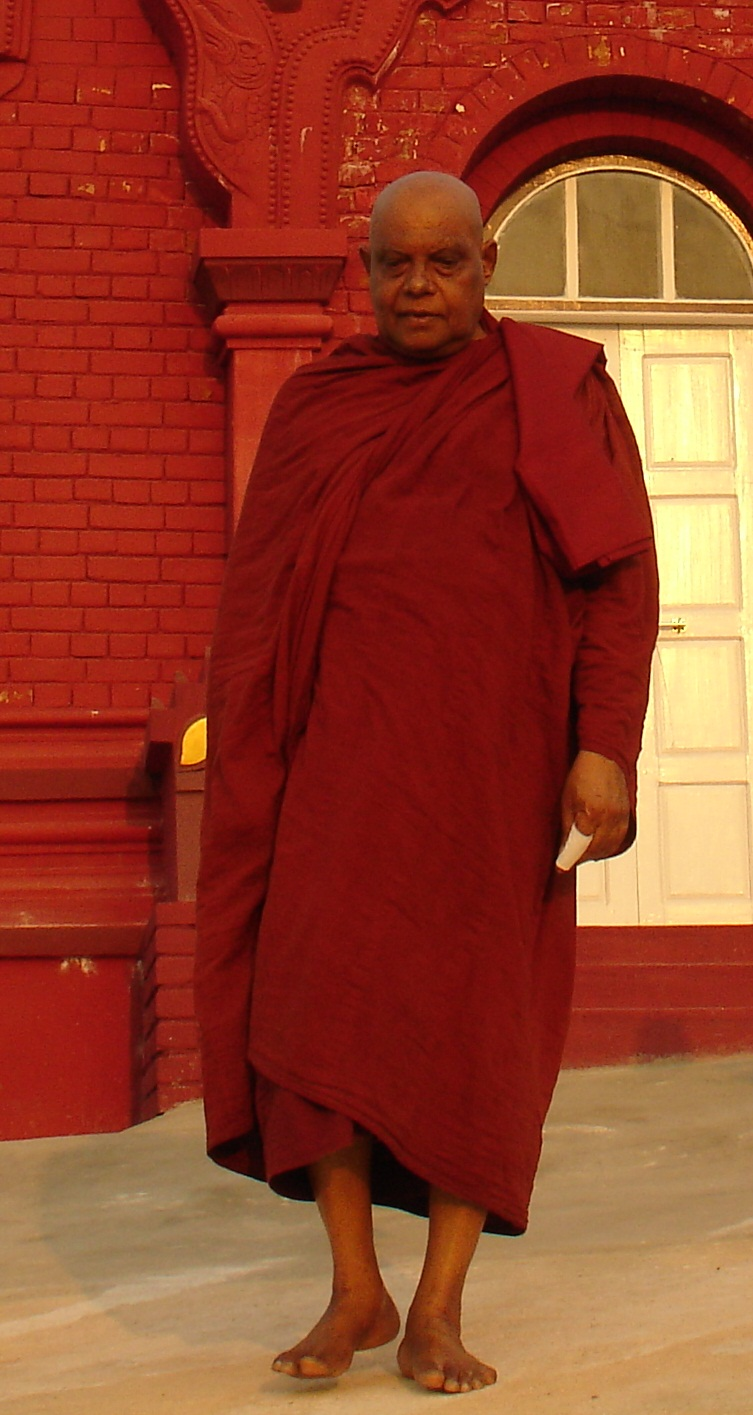
- Most Ven. Nauyane Ariyadhamma Mahāthēra at BVMC monastery in Burma
- Title: Tripitaka Vagishvaracarya, Mahopadhyaya, Maha Kammatthanacarya, Maha Thera

Personal life
- Born: 24 April 1939 Imihaminnegama, Kurunegala
- Died: 7 September 2016 (aged 77)

Religious life
- Religion: Buddhism
- School: Theravada
- Sect: Śrī Kalyāṇī Yogāśrama Saṃsthā of Rāmañña Nikāya
- Ordination: 1957

Senior posting
- Teacher: Most Ven. Matara Sri Nanarama Mahathera, Most Ven. Bhaddanta Āciṇṇa
- Based in: Sri Lanka

Most Venerable Nauyane Ariyadhamma Mahāthēra‍ (Sinhala: අතිපූජ්‍යය නා උයනේ අරියධම්ම මහා ථේර, 24 April 1939 – 6 September 2016) was a Sri Lankan bhikkhu (Buddhist monk) and a senior meditation teacher. He was the spiritual advisor of the Śrī Kalyāṇī Yogāśrama Saṃsthā, and for many years resided at the Nā Uyana Āranya. In 2011 he moved to Meetirigala Dharmayatanaya to help revitalise this long-standing place of learning and dhamma practice.

== Early life ==
Ven. Ariyadhamma Mahāthēra was born on 24 April 1939 to a traditional Buddhist family in Kurunegala and was educated at the Government School of Nilagama. His father was a supporter of Most Venerable Vigoda Bodhirakkhitha Mahāthēra, who was resident at the nearby Nā Uyana Āranya forest monastery. The close relationship with the monks from childhood inspired his decision to ordain, and he trained under Bōdhiraḳḳhitha Mahāthēra in 1956 as an upasaka. He went forth on 27 March 1957 with Ven. Matara Sri Nanarama Mahathera as his upajjhaya and received upasampada on 15 July 1959 with Ven. Madawala Dhammatilaka Mahāthēra as the upajjhaya.

== Monastic life ==
Ven. Ariyadhamma Mahāthēra studied under several learned elders, including Getamanne Sri Vimalavamsa Mahāthēra, Ven. Kadawedduwe Sri Jinavamsa Mahāthēra, Ven. Devagoda Mangalasiri Mahāthēra and Ven. Matara Sri Nanarama Mahāthēra. He studied the Burmese language from Ven. Nyaninda Sayadaw while he was in Sri Lanka in 1964.

He was proficient in Pali and Sanskrit and had extensive knowledge of the Pali Canon and the Pali commentaries. He was a teacher at the Gunawardena Yogasrama (the headquarters of Śrī Kalyāṇī Yogāśrama Saṃsthā) from 1965 to 1995. Ven Ariyadhamma Thera was appointed the registrar of Śrī Kalyāṇī Yogāśrama Saṃsthā in 1969, a position he held until being appointed the spiritual advisor and head of the organisation in 2003. In this capacity, he led about 1,500 forest monks in 193 branch monasteries.

== Meditation practice ==
During the 1960s, Ven. Ariyadhamma Mahāthēra studied the Mahasi meditation system under Ven. Matara Sri Nanarama Mahāthēra, and was guided in traditional Sri Lankan meditation methods by Ven. Matale Silarakkhita Mahāthēra of Ruwangirikanda Aranya. He did retreats at Mahasi centres in Burma in 1992 and 1993.

In 1996, Ven. Ariyadhamma Mahāthēra practiced under Most Venerable Sayadaw Bhaddanta Āciṇṇa (Pa-Auk Tawya Sayadaw) at Pa-Auk Meditation Centre in Mawlamyine, Burma. On returning to Sri Lanka in the beginning of 1997, he introduced the method to the Śrī Kalyāṇī Yogāśrama Saṃsthā, and there are several monasteries in the organisation now practicing the Pa-Auk method. He did further retreats at the same centre in 1997, 2001 and 2010.

He taught meditation to monks and lay practitioners since 1977. In 2006, he was awarded the ‘Mahākammaṭṭhānācariya’ (‘Great Meditation Teacher’) title by the Government of the Burma in recognition of his services in teaching Dhamma and meditation.

== Awards ==
The Sri Lanka Ramanna Nikaya awarded Ven. Ariyadhamma Mahāthēra the titles of ‘Tripiṭaka Vāgīśvarācārya’ and ‘Mahopādhyāya’. The Government of Burma awarded him the title ‘Mahā Kammaṭṭhānācāriya’.

== Publications ==
Ven. Ariyadhamma Mahāthēra has written more than 100 books and booklets in Sinhala on meditation and Dhamma. A few of these have been translated to English.

== See also ==
- Śrī Kalyāṇī Yogāśrama Saṃsthā
- Nā Uyana Āranya
