= Ayya Khema =

German Buddhist nun (1923–1997)

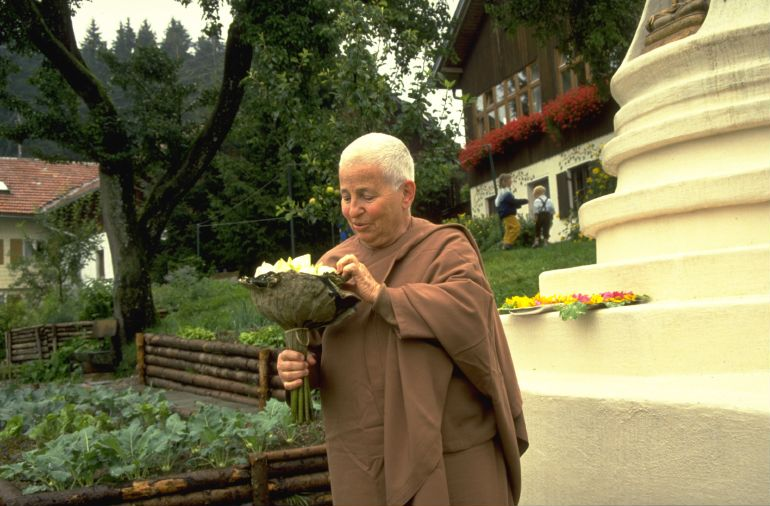
- Title: bhikkhunī

Personal life
- Born: Ilse Kussel; August 25, 1923 Berlin, Germany
- Died: November 2, 1997 (aged 74)

Religious life
- Religion: Theravada

Senior posting
- Teacher: Ven. Narada Maha Thera (first ordination); Ven. Hsing Yun (second ordination)

Ayya Khema (born Ilse Kussel; August 25, 1923 – November 2, 1997) was a Buddhist teacher noted for providing opportunities for women to practice Buddhism, founding several centers around the world. In 1987, she helped coordinate the first-ever Sakyadhita International Association of Buddhist Women. Over two dozen books of her transcribed Dhamma talks in English and German have been published. In the last year of her life, she also published her autobiography: I Give You My Life.

== Biography ==
Khema was born as Ilse Kussel in Berlin, Germany in 1923 to Jewish parents. In 1938, her parents escaped from Germany and traveled to China while plans were made for Khema to join two hundred other children emigrating to Glasgow, Scotland. After two years in Scotland, Khema joined her parents in Shanghai. With the outbreak of the war, Japan conquered Shanghai and the family was moved into the Shanghai Ghetto in Hongkew where her father died five days before the war ended.

At age twenty-two, Khema married a man seventeen years her senior named Johannes and they moved to an apartment in the Hongkou District. In 1947, her first child, a daughter named Irene, was born. As the People's Liberation Army were on the cusp of taking Shanghai, Khema and her family fled for San Francisco, California, United States. From San Francisco, Khema moved to Los Angeles and then San Diego where she gave birth to her second child, a son named Jeffrey.

Soon, Khema began feeling incomplete and investigated various spiritual paths, an interest her husband didn't share. This led to their divorce. Khema moved with her infant son to Rancho La Puerta in Tecate, Mexico, to study the philosophy of the Essenes with Professor Edmund Skekely. There she married her second husband, Gerd. The whole family soon became vegetarian, a practice Khema continued until her death.

The three traveled for years, visiting South America, New Zealand, Australia, Pakistan, then settling in Sydney, Australia, where Khema began to study with Phra Khantipalo.

To further her studies, Khema traveled to San Francisco to study Zen at the San Francisco Zen Center and worked at Tassajara Zen Mountain Center for three months. She then spent three weeks in Burma where she studied meditation with students of U Ba Khin.

In 1978, Khema founded the Wat Buddha Dhamma forest monastery in New South Wales and installed Phra Khantipalo as abbot.

Khema's desire to become a Buddhist nun led her to Thailand where she studied with Tan Ajahn Singtong for three months. Sri Lanka was her next destination where she met Nyanaponika Thera who introduced her to Narada Maha Thera. Narada Thera gave her the name "Ayya Khema".

A 1983 return trip to Sri Lanka, led her to meet her teacher, Ven. Matara Sri Ñānarāma of Nissarana Vanaya, who inspired her to teach jhana meditation. As it was not possible at the time to organize an ordination ceremony for bhikkhunis in the Theravada tradition, Ayya Khema then received complete monastic ordination at the newly built Hsi Lai Temple, a Chinese Mahayana temple under the Fo Guang Shan Buddhist Order, in 1988.

Khema was one of the organizers of the first International Conference on Buddhist Women in 1987 which led to the foundation of the Sakyadhita International Association of Buddhist Women.

In 1989, Khema returned to Germany and began teaching at Buddha Haus in Munich.

According to Ayya Khema's own account, she had been suffering from breast cancer since 1983. In 1993, she underwent a mastectomy operation in Germany. During a five-week recovery period in the hospital she almost died, but her condition was expeditiously stabilized by the medics. In an interview she expressed a positive opinion of that experience.

There were two days in the hospital, when I had that feeling, that the energy was leaving, through the feet actually. There was a collapse of the whole system... Losing one's life energy is actually a very pleasant state, because there's less self-assertion, I mean you haven't got the energy to assert yourself. So things are more acceptable, everything is acceptable, it's fine the way it is... One could say that action of dying, if there's no resistance, is extremely pleasant... That seemed to be less and less life energy within the body, and I just was relaxing into that. I was perfectly willing to let it happen, but then these doctors came round... My blood pressure just went way down, waaay down, I mean like almost not happening, and that's when you lose all your energy... It was a very interesting experience and now I can see it's extremely pleasant. It's just letting go and disappearing, and it's very nice.

Ayya Khema died on November 2, 1997, at Buddha Haus, Uttenbühl (part of the village Oy-Mittelberg) in Germany after fourteen years with breast cancer. Her ashes are kept in a stupa at Buddha Haus.

== Publications ==
- Being Nobody, Going Nowhere: Meditations on the Buddhist Path, Wisdom Publications, 1987, ISBN 978-0861711987
- When the Iron Eagle Flies: Buddhism for the West, Wisdom Publications, 1991 ISBN 978-0861711697
- Who is myself? A guide to Buddhist meditation (commentary on the Poṭṭhapāda Sutta), Wisdom Publications, 1997, ISBN 978-0861711277
- I Give You My Life (autobiography), Shambhala Publications, 1997, ISBN 978-1570625718
- Come and See for Yourself: The Buddhist Path to Happiness, Windhorse Publications, 1998, ISBN 978-1899579457
- Be an Island: The Buddhist practice of Inner Peace, Wisdom Publications, 1999, ISBN 978-0861711475
- Visible Here and Now: The Buddhist Teachings on the Rewards of Spiritual Practice (commentary on the Samaññaphala Sutta), Shambhala Publications, 2001, ISBN 978-1570624926
- Know Where You're Going: A Complete Buddhist Guide to Meditation, Faith, and Everyday Transcendence (retitled republication of When the Iron Eagle Flies), Wisdom Publications, 2014, ISBN 978-1614291930
- The Meditative Mind (retitled republication of To Be Seen Here And Now), Buddhist Publication Society, 2012, ISBN 978-9552403859
- Within Our Own Hearts, Buddhist Publication Society, 2012, ISBN 978-9552402906

=== Bodhi Leaf Publications (BPS) ===
- Self-Image and Self-Knowledge (BL105)
- Meditating On No-Self (BL95)

== See also ==
- Vipassanā
- Nissarana Vanaya
- Matara Sri Nanarama Mahathera
- Narada Maha Thera
- Buddhist monasticism
- Thai Forest Tradition
- Ayya (Pali word)
