= Poy Sang Long =

Shan Theravada Buddhist novitiation ceremony

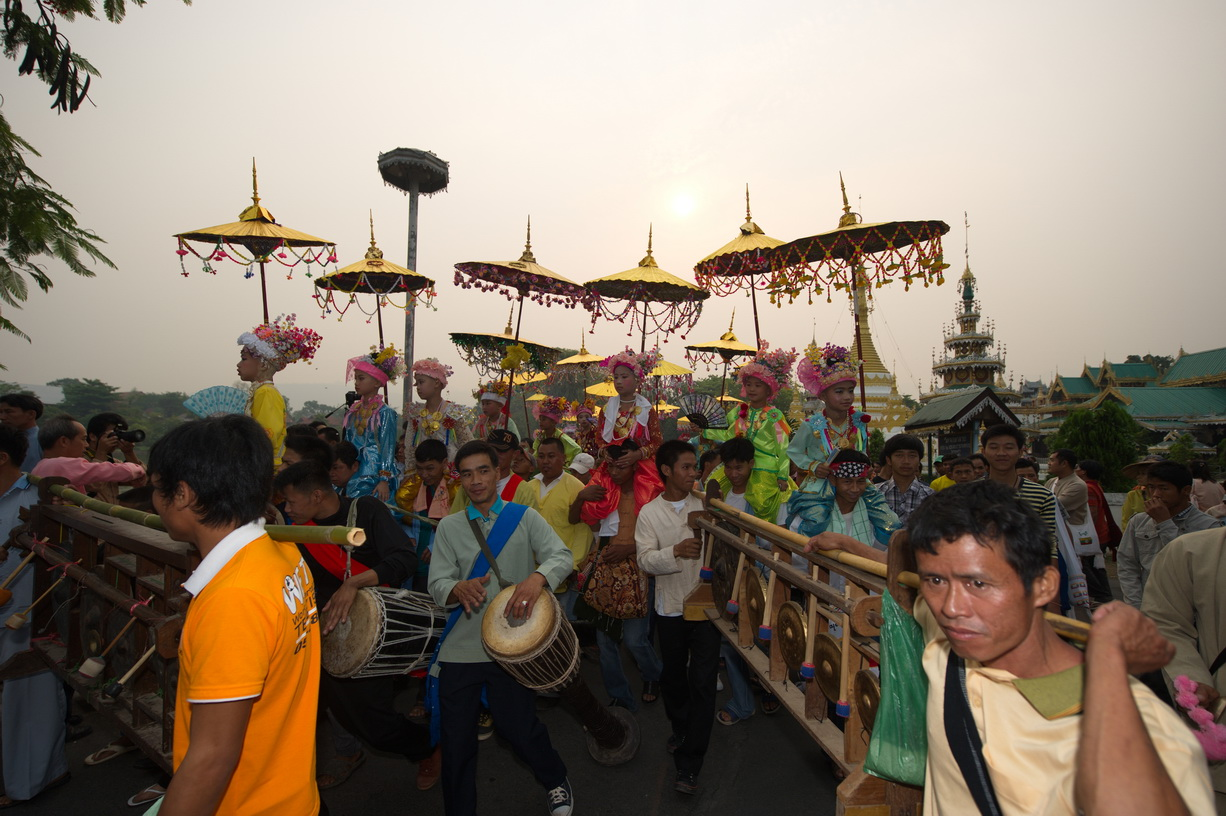
Poy Sang Long in Mae Hong Son, northern Thailand

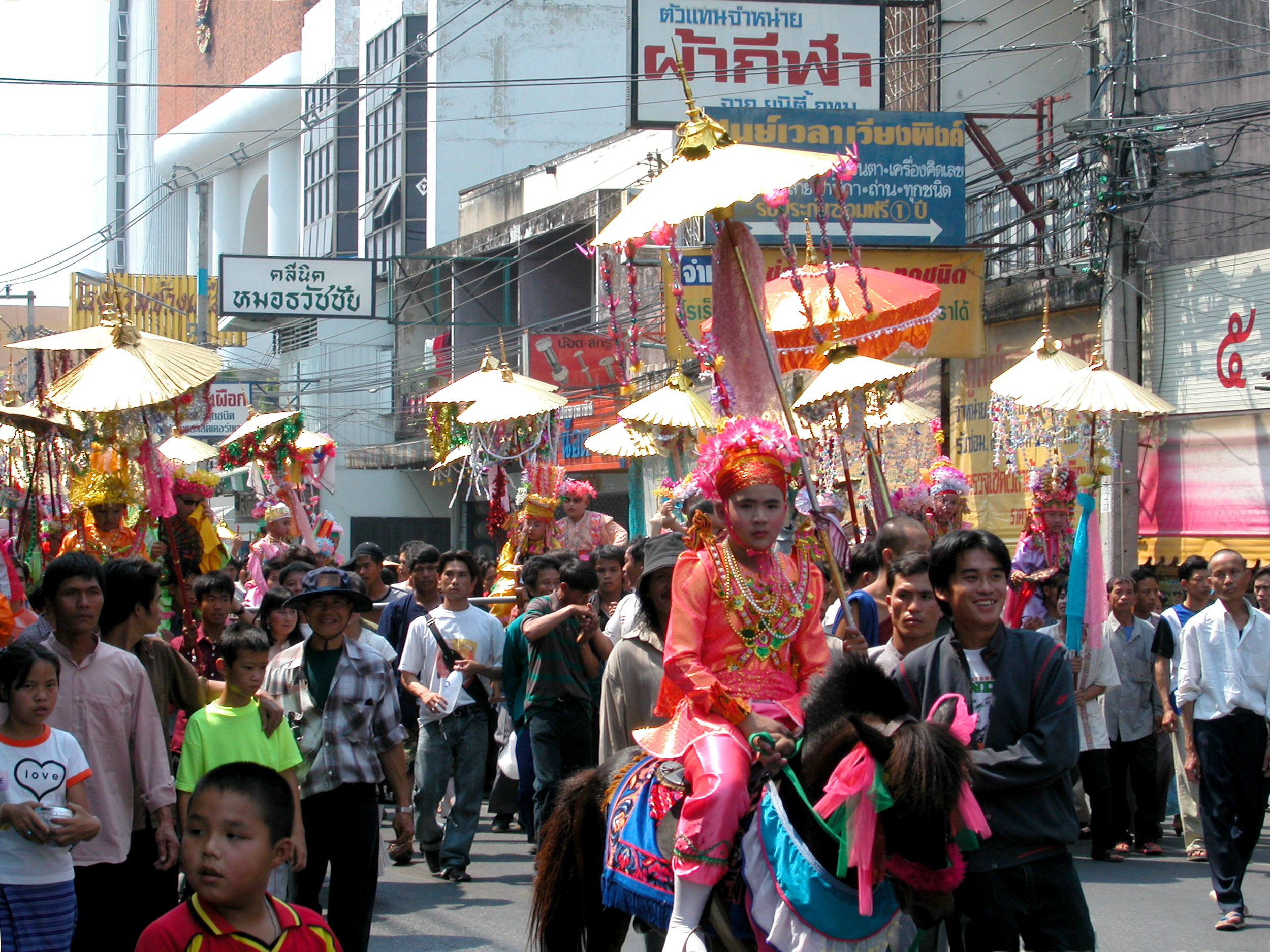
Poy Sang Long in Chiang Mai, northern Thailand

Poy sang long (Shan: ပွႆးသၢင်ႇလွင်း) is a rite of passage ceremony among the Shan peoples, in Myanmar and in neighbouring northern Thailand, undergone by boys at some point between seven and fourteen years of age. It consists of taking novice monastic vows and participating in monastery life for a period of time that can vary from a week to many months or more. Usually, a large group of boys is ordained as sāmaṇera (novitiate monk) at the same time.

== Etymology ==
The Tai Yai name poy sang long is decomposed as follows:

- poy (ပွႆး) meaning 'event', borrowed from Burmese pwe (ပွဲ);
- sang (သၢင်ႇ), thought to come from either khun sang ('brahman') or sang ('novice monk');
- long (လွင်း), from along meaning Bodhisattva or 'king's lineage', borrowed from Burmese alaung (အလောင်း). Long (လွင်း), from Burmese laung (လောင်း), also means "stage before the final change." Thus, sang long (သၢင်ႇလွင်း) refers to a "boy or young man before becoming a novice monk."

== Observances ==
In neighbouring Thailand, where Shan immigrants have brought over the traditions from Myanmar, the ceremony goes on for three days, as the boys (dressed like princes in imitation of Gautama Buddha, who was himself a prince before setting out on the religious path) spend the entire time being carried around on the shoulders of their older male relatives. On the third day, they are ordained and enter the monastery for a period of at least one week, and perhaps many years.

== See also ==
- Pabbajjā
- Upasampadā
- Shinbyu
