= Na Uyana Aranya =

Forest monastery in Sri Lanka

Coordinates: 7°44′16.25″N 80°30′59.67″E

Nā Uyana Āranya Senāsanaya
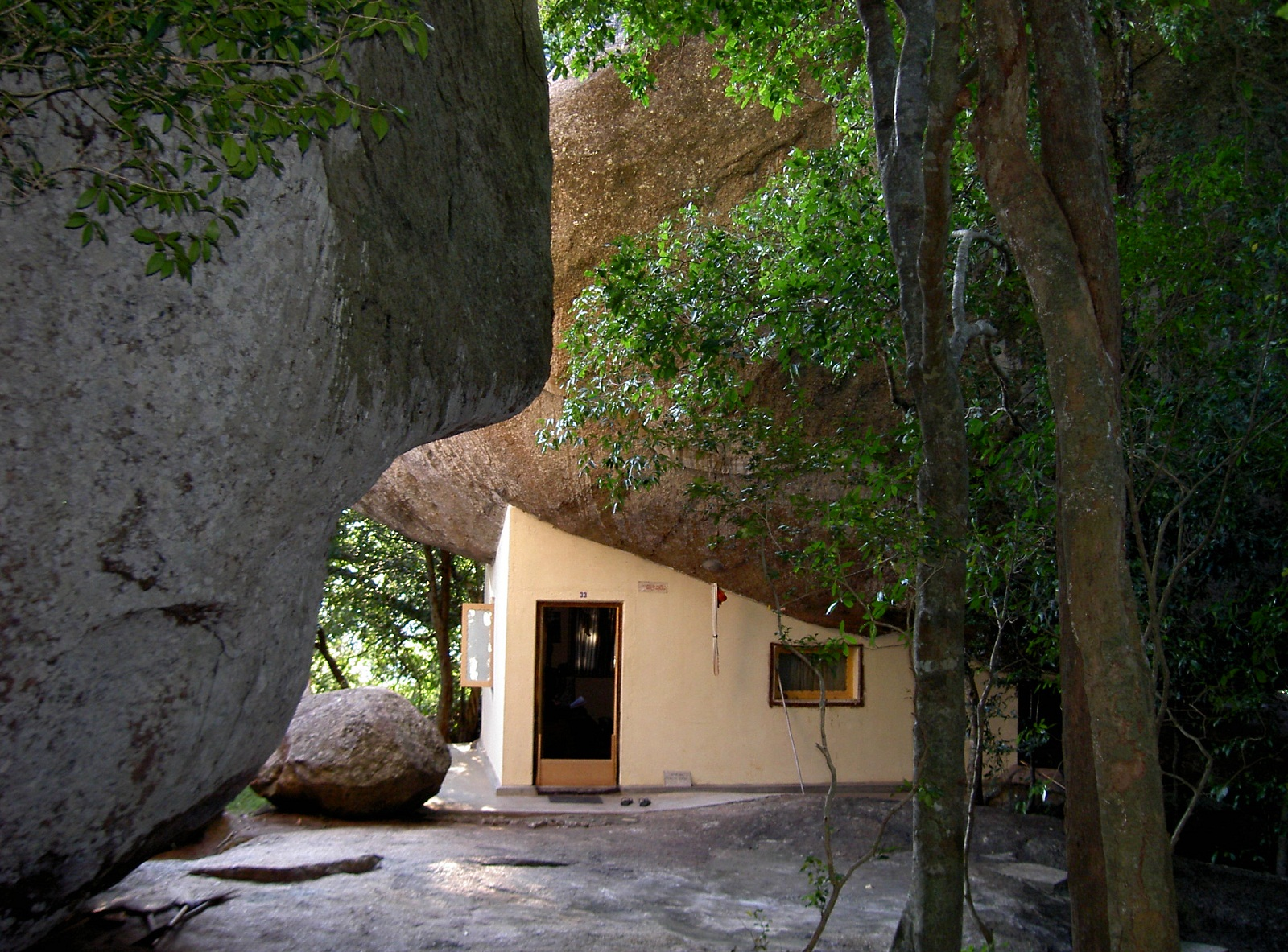
- Cave Kuṭi in Nā Uyana Āranya

Religion
- Affiliation: Śrī Kalyāṇī Yogāśrama Saṃsthā

Location
- Location: Nā Uyana Āranya Senāsanaya, Pansiyagama 60554, Sri Lanka
- Country: Sri Lanka
- Interactive map of Nā Uyana Āranya Senāsanaya

Architecture
- Founder: Most Venerable Vigoda Bōdhirakkhitha Mahāthēra
- Completed: 1954

Website
- https://nauyana.org

Nā Uyana Āranya Senāsanaya (Sinhala: නා උයන ආරණ්‍ය සේනාසනය, meaning 'Ironwood Grove Forest Monastery') is a Buddhist forest monastery in Kurunegala, Sri Lanka, associated with the Śrī Kalyāṇī Yogāśrama Saṃsthā. It spreads over more than 2,040 hectares (5,000 acres) of forest on the 'Dummiya' mountain range and is residence to about 150 Buddhist monks. Nā Uyana is so named because of the old Ceylon ironwood forest that forms part of the monastery. The monastery is the main monastery complex and meditation centre of the Nā Uyana International Buddhist Association. The main meditation method practiced by Nā Uyana is based on the method introduced by Pa-Auk Sayadaw in the Pa-Auk Forest Monastery tradition.

== History ==
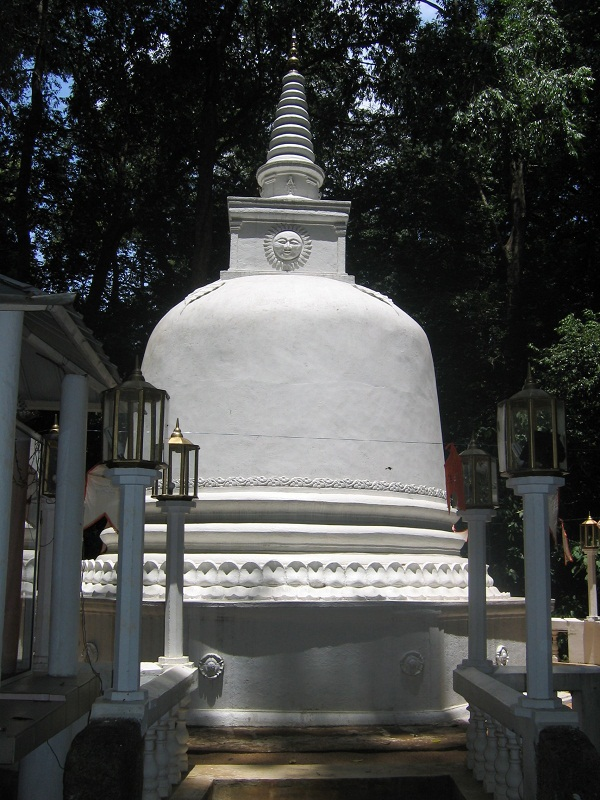
Stupa of Nā Uyana Āranya, surrounded by Ceylon ironwood trees

Ancient cave dwellings with Brāhmī inscriptions, as well as ruins of a small Stupa complex, have been found at Nā Uyana which date back to 3rd century BCE. The new stupa of the monastery is built on the location of this complex. One inscription states that King Uttiya has donated his pleasure grove to the Sangha. As Uttiya was the successor to King Devanampiya Tissa, during whose reign Buddhism was introduced to Sri Lanka, the ancient monastery at Nā Uyana seems to have been one of the first in the country established outside Anuradhapura.

The ancient monastery was rediscovered by Most Venerable Bōdhiraḳḳhitha Mahāthēra in 1954. Sayadaw U Nandavamsa and Sayadaw U Javana, senior Burmese disciples of Mahasi Sayadaw, visited the monastery in 1956.

Most Venerable Angulgamuwe Ariyananda Mahāthēra moved to Nā Uyana in 1997 with a group of monks and started a revival that has made it the largest monastery in the Yogasrama Samstha. It is also one of the main international monasteries in Sri Lanka, with about 25 foreign monks. Most Venerable Nauyane Ariyadhamma Mahāthēra, the Spiritual Director of Śrī Kalyāṇī Yogāśrama Saṃsthā, also used to reside at Nā Uyana.

On 24 September 2025, the cable of the funicular operated by Nā Uyana snapped, causing it to slide uncontrollably downhill and to crash, killing eight monks and injuring five others.

== Layout ==
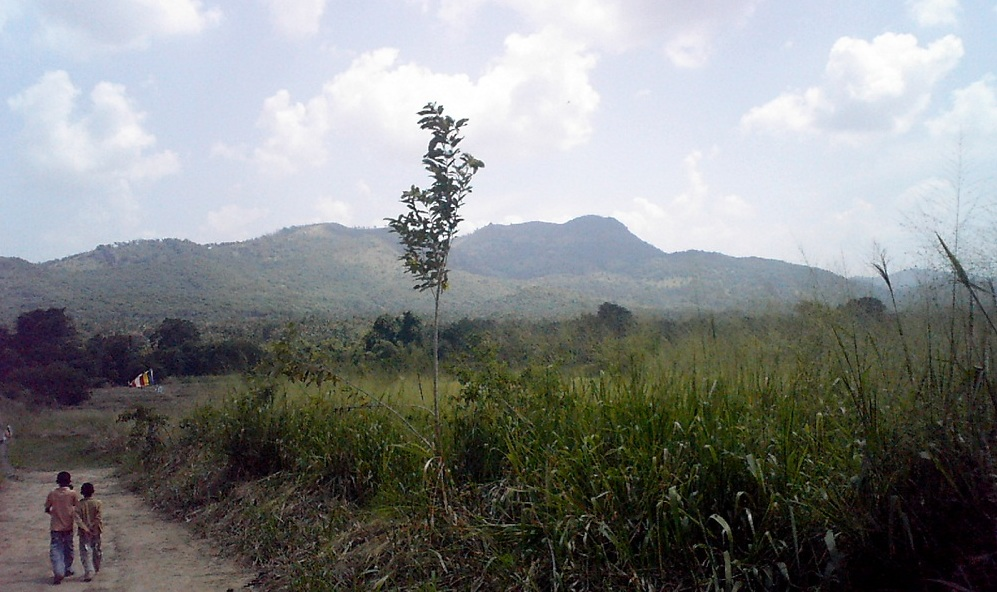
The Dummiya mountain range, home to Nā Uyana Āranya. On the right side is the Pansiyagama section, on the center the 'Mountain' and on the left the Matale section.

Nā Uyana has 4 main sections: Pansiyagama (or Kurunegala), 'Mountain', Matale and Aandagala, each about 30 minutes of a walk apart from the other. Pansiyagama section is the ancient monastery within the ironwood forest and contains the uposatha hall, meditation hall, refectory, library and offices in addition to about 80 kutis (monks' residences). 'Mountain' is the newly developed area on the main hill of the monastery, which has about 80 kutis and the main meditation hall. This area is being reforested. Matale section, which has about 20 kutis and a smaller meditation hall, is situated among grassy hills with less forest cover. Aandagala is a remote, densely forested area in the monastery which is not in direct contact with others, and is reserved for the most austere dhutanga practitioners. There are 4 mud huts in this area, and the occupants must go on almsround to the nearby villages. Meals are provided separately for the first three sections, yet some monks prefer going for alms. Nā Uyana operates a simple funicular.

== Meditation ==
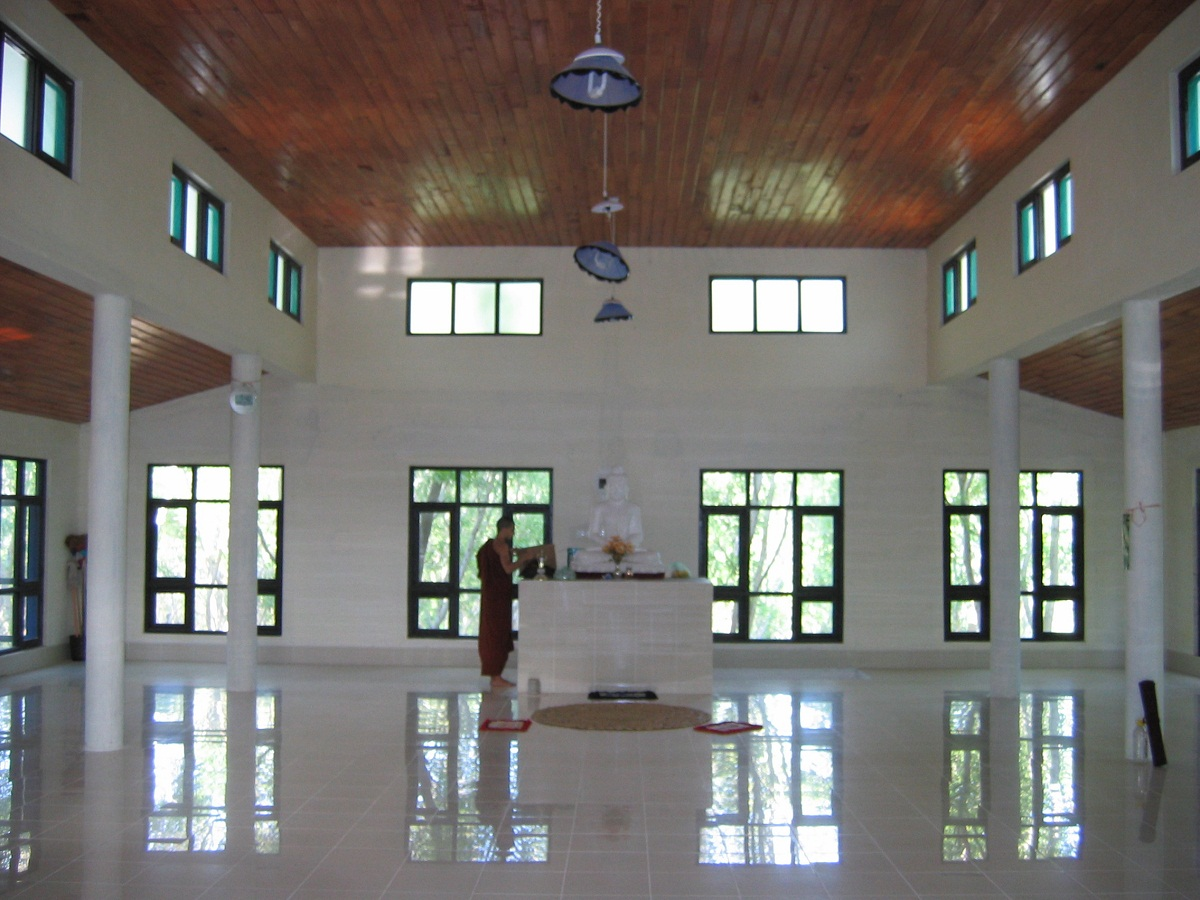
The first floor of the meditation hall in the 'Middle-Mountain Section'

Nā Uyana Āranya is one of the two principal meditation monasteries of the Śrī Kalyāṇī Yogāśrama Saṃsthā, along with Nissarana Vanaya. The main meditation method taught is 'Pa-Auk Samatha Vipassana', and the senior meditation teacher is Most Venerable Ariyananda Mahāthēra. It was possible to have interviews with Most Venerable Nauyane Ariyadhamma Mahāthēra, while he was there and before he died. Practitioners may join the group sittings conducted in the two main meditation halls, or continue on their own in their kutis.

Most Venerable Bhaddanta Āciṇṇa Mahāthēra, the current Pa-Auk sayadaw, undertook a long-term personal retreat at Nā Uyana Āranya in 2007, staying in seclusion and suspending his teaching schedule throughout the year.

== Directions ==
Take the road to Madahapola at the Melsiripura junction (between Kurunegala and Dambulla) on the A6 highway. At the Pansiyagama junction on the Madahapola road, take the road to Galewela. About 1 km on this road is the Nā Uyana road, which leads to the monastery.

== See also ==
- Nauyane Ariyadhamma Mahāthēra
- Śrī Kalyāṇī Yogāśrama Saṃsthā
- Nissarana Vanaya
