= Matara Sri Nanarama Mahathera =

Sri Lankan Buddhist monk and meditation master

Most Ven. Matara Sri Nanarama Maha Thera
- Title: Kammatthanacariya, Maha Thera

Personal life
- Born: Don Dias Jayathunga; 11 December 1901 Bajjima Village, Tikkannagoda (presently known as Uduwe), Matara
- Died: 30 April 1992 (aged 90) cremated in Galduwa Yogasrama premises, Galduva Aranya, Kahawa, Ambalangoda
- Notable work(s): Chief Preceptor of Sri Kalyani Yogasrama Samstha, Kammatthanacariya Thera of Nissarana Vanaya, Meethirigala

Religious life
- Religion: Buddhism
- School: Theravada
- Sect: Ramanna Nikaya; Sri Kalyani Yogasrama Samstha
- Ordination: 10 July 1922 (higher ordination)

Senior posting
- Teacher: Most Ven. Sastrawelliye Upasena Nayaka Maha Thera
- Students: Most Ven. Nauyane Ariyadhamma Mahathera, Most Ven. Udaeriyagama Dhammajiva Mahathera

Most Ven. Mātara Sri Ñāṇārāma Mahā Thera (December 11, 1901 – April 30, 1992) (spelled Ñāṇārāma in Pali, sometimes called Gnanarama or Nyanarama in Sinhala, Sinhala: අති පූජ්‍ය මාතර ශ්‍රී ඤාණාරාම මහා ථේර) was an influential Sri Lankan meditation master, scholar and forest monk of the 20th century.

== Childhood ==
On December 11, 1901, Dedduwa Jayathungage Don Bastian, from Bajjima Village in Tikkannagoda (now known as Uduwe) in the deep south of Sri Lanka, welcomed the birth of a son. Named Don Dias Jayathunga, the devoted parents dedicated their young child to the service of the Buddha Sasana on his seventh birthday, placing him under the guidance of Ven. Dedduwe Wimalajothi of Aliyatholla Temple, who was a family relative from his lay life.

== Ordination ==
Young Jayathunga was ordained in December 1917 with the given name of Ven. Matara Nanarama under the patronage of Ven. Matale Aggadhammalankara Thera. Young samanera Nanarama was bent on perfecting his knowledge in Dhamma pursued the Dhamma education with utmost zeal. He received higher ordination on 10 July 1922 under Ven. Sastrawelliye Upasena Nayaka Thera.

Focused on experiencing wisdom, Ven. Nanarama gave up all common comforts with the goal of achieving Nibbana. Some nights he spent without sleep, absorbed in the study of Suttas. He studied Tipitaka, Logic, Chandolankara, and other contemporary philosophies as a young man.

== Meditation Master ==
In 1951 the Most Venerable Kadawedduwe Jinavamsa Mahathera started a programme of activities for upholding the diminishing status of the Sangha in Sri Lanka, and invited Ven. Nanarama to head the program of the newly established Sri Kalyani Yogasrama Samstha. This organisation was set up as an association of hundreds of forest monasteries throughout Sri Lanka of the Ramanna Nikaya ordination line. Young monks were properly trained in the monastic code, connections with the Burmese Sangha were intensified and meditation training was guided by Ven. Nanarama.

During the year of 2500 Buddha Jayanthi, several Burmese meditation masters arrived in Sri Lanka. Ven. Matara Nanarama Thera joined the retreats conducted by these teachers at the Danawkande Sri Mangala Yogasramaya, and advanced rapidly on the path of insight meditation. Having observed the talent and zeal of Venerable Nanarama, the Burmese masters taught him every aspect of the practice and acknowledged his status as a Kammatthanacariya (Meditation Teacher) in the Burmese Vipassana system.

== Nissarana Vanaya ==
During this time another rare opportunity opened up for the advancement of sasana in Sri Lanka. The Buddhist philanthropist Asoka Weeraratna who selected a land and developed the forest hermitage at Meethirigala, called Nissarana Vanaya, was searching for a teacher to head this meditation center for Bhikkhus. Mr Weeraratna was able to persuade Venerable Nanarama Thera to take up this position. At this Nissarana Vanaya countless Bhikkus and lay devotees both local and foreign received instructions for their advancement on the path and many reaped benefit. Some of these instructions were recorded on tape and were made available in printed form as well. The recorded talks can be downloaded from the internet. Several books written based on the talks have been translated to western languages and have helped hundreds of seekers in the west.

A few years later Venerable Katukurunde Nanananda Thera, a former Pali lecturer at the University of Peradeniya joined Nissarana Vanaya and became one the closest disciples of Venerable Nanarama Thera. Other leading monks included Venerable Khemananda and Dhammajiva.

Venerable Sri Matara Nanarama Thera died on 30 April 1992 and the cremation took place on 7 May 1992 among thousands of devotees at the Galduwa Yogasrama premises.

== See also ==
- Kadawedduwe Jinavamsa Mahathera
- Sri Kalyani Yogasrama Samstha
- Nissarana Vanaya
