= Nissarana Vanaya =

Monastery in Sri Lanka

Nissaraṇa Vanaya

Religion
- Affiliation: Sri Kalyani Yogasrama Samstha

Location
- Location: Nissarana Vanaya, Meetirigala 11742, Sri Lanka
- Country: Sri Lanka

Architecture
- Founder: Asoka Weeraratna
- Completed: 1967

Website
- http://www.nissarana.lk/

Nissaraṇa Vanaya (Sinhala: නිස්සරණ වනය) is a meditation monastery in Sri Lanka. It is located in Mitirigala in the Western Province close to the town of Kirindiwela.

== History ==
Meetirigala Nissarana Vanaya is a monastery in the Kalyāṇi Yogāsrama Samsthava, or Galduwa Samsthava, the strictest forest tradition in Sri Lanka. It is considered as one of Sri Lanka's most respected meditation monasteries and was founded in 1967 by Asoka Weeraratna (the founder of the German Dharmaduta Society and the Berlin Buddhist Vihara in Germany). He found a meditation master, Ven. Matara Sri Nanarama Mahathera (author of Seven stages of Purification and Seven Contemplations, both published by the BPS), who directed the meditation training, and after his mission was accomplished, he entered the Buddhist order under the name Mitirigala Dhammanisanthi. He died on July 2, 1999, after spending 27 years as a forest monk at Mitirigala. Dhammanisanthi was 80 years of age at the time of his death.

The senior monk, Venerable Matara Sri Nanarama Mahathera, was the first abbot and the meditation master. Nanarama was appointed as the head meditation master of a chain of forest monasteries throughout the island called Kalyāṇi Yogāsrama Samsthava or Galduwa Samsthava. Nanarama incorporates the Burmese Vipassana techniques into Sri Lankan meditation traditions with the teaching of samatha meditation. Buddhist nun Ayya Khema was taught by Ven. Ñāṇanārāma in the practice of the jhāna or samatha meditation.

On his death in 1992, a senior pupil, Venerable Panaduwa Khemananda, succeeded Nanarama and served the monastery for 15 years. Katukurunde Nanananda Thera (famous for his books Concept and Reality, Nibbana-The Mind Stilled and his series of 33 sermons on Nibbana) left the monastery due to its shifting away from the meditation training established by Ven. Ñāṇārāma.

Nanananda moved to Potgulgala Aranya, near Devalegama, Kegalla, where he is still residing. A few years ago, he was connected with the Mangalarama at Meetirigala. Nissarana Vanaya moved closer to current Burmese Vipassana teachings. Panaduwa Khemananda died in July 2006; the new senior meditation teacher became Venerable Uda-Iriyagama Dhammajeewa Thera. Dhammajeewa (or Dhammajiva) is fluent in English and Burmese and has translated several meditation guides and books from Burmese into English and Sinhalese. Matara Sri Nanananda spent several years of training under Sayadaw U Panditabhiwansa in Myanmar.

== Life at the monastery ==
The monks practice meditation and stay in solitary huts in the forest. Meditation is done in a large meditation hall in the centre of the monastery. Most monks meditate alone in their huts in the forest. The monks don't eat after mid-day. In the evening, there is a worship of the Bodhi Tree and Buddha, followed by Pali chanting.

== Other meditation monasteries at Meetirigala ==
Meetirigala (sometimes written Mithrigala or Meethirigala) is also the location of two other monasteries. One is the Dharmayatana, a place for Tipitaka studies which was later turned into a Vipassana meditation facility for monks to follow Venerable Pa Auk Sayadaw's system of instructions. This place is also part of the Kalyāṇi Yogāsrama Samsthava tradition. The Mangalarama is not connected to Nissarana Vanaya and the Dharmayatana.

== See also ==
- Katukurunde Nyanananda Thera
- Sri Kalyani Yogasrama Samstha
- Na Uyana Aranya
