= Sri Kalyani Yogasrama Samstha =

Sri Lankan Theravada forest monastic organization

Sri Kalyani Yogashrama Samstha
- ශ්‍රී කල්‍යාණී ‍යෝගාශ්‍රම සංස්ථාව
- Seal of the Śrī Kalyāṇī Yogāśrama Saṁsthā
- Formation: June 18, 1951; 75 years ago
- Type: Buddhist monastic order
- Headquarters: Galduva Aranya (Sri Gunawardhana Yogashramaya), Kahawa, Ambalangoda, Sri Lanka
- Leader: Pahalavitiyala Janananda
- Key people: Kadawedduwe Jinavamsa (Founder); Matara Sri Nanarama (First Chief Preceptor)
- Website: yogashramaya.org

Śrī Kalyāṇī Yogāśrama Saṁsthā (Pali: Siri Kalyāṇī Yogassama Santhā, Sinhala: ශ්‍රී කල්‍යාණී ‍යෝගාශ්‍රම සංස්ථාව), commonly known as the Galduwa Forest Tradition, is a Sri Lankan Theravāda forest-monastic organization of the Rāmañña Nikāya ordination tradition, now within the Amarapura–Rāmañña Nikāya. It was founded on 18 June 1951 by Kadawedduwe Jinavamsa Mahathera, with Matara Sri Nanarama Mahathera serving as its principal meditation teacher and first Maha Upajjhaya. Its headquarters are at Galduva Aranya near Ambalangoda.

The Saṁsthā emphasizes meditation and strict observance of the Vinaya. The Galduwa tradition has been described as Sri Lanka's largest network of forest monasteries, with about 150 affiliated monasteries, as following traditional commentarial interpretations in matters of monastic discipline, and as accepting candidates from all castes for ordination. As of 2024, its monastic community numbered about 700 monks.

== History ==
=== Origins and foundation ===
Kadawedduwe Jinavamsa Mahathera was ordained at the age of 13 and later founded the Thebuvana Granthakara Pirivena, where he served as head instructor for more than twenty years. He subsequently left this position to pursue forest-based monastic practice, travelling in search of suitable residences with Gatamanne Vimalavamsa Thera.

On 18 June 1951, in connection with preparations for the 2500th Buddha Jayanti, Jinavamsa founded the Śrī Kalyāṇī Yogāśrama Sanstha as an association of forest monasteries devoted to meditation and monastic discipline. Nimalawa Aranya Senasanaya at Kirinda was selected as the association's first hermitage. Galduva Aranya later became its central monastery and principal venue for ordination ceremonies.

Following the establishment of the Sanstha, Jinavamsa sought a qualified senior monk to serve as its spiritual head. After repeated invitations, Matara Sri Nanarama Mahathera accepted the role. Jinavamsa served as founder and chief administrator, while Nanarama became the principal meditation teacher and first Maha Upajjhaya (chief preceptor). Nanarama remained Maha Upajjhaya until his death in 1992.

=== Growth and expansion ===
Despite opposition from some contemporary monastics and laypeople, the Sanstha expanded rapidly. By its tenth anniversary in 1961, it comprised about 100 monks and 40 hermitages.

The organization continued to expand throughout Sri Lanka. By 2018, approximately 150 monasteries were affiliated with the Galduwa tradition, and in 2024 its monastic community numbered about 700 monks.

== Monastic discipline and practices ==
Bhikkhus ordained in other monastic traditions who wished to reside long-term in Galduwa monasteries have historically been required to have their ordination accepted according to the tradition's standards. This formerly included a daḷhikamma, a ceremony intended to reconfirm an existing upasampadā; as of 2018, however, the procedure was reportedly no longer performed in most monasteries. Monks ordained in the Pa-Auk and Ajahn Chah traditions were accepted without a new upasampadā.

Monks of the tradition are also traditionally distinguished by their use of palm-leaf umbrellas and by wearing the saṅghāṭi (double robe) when outside monastery boundaries.

== Affiliated hermitages ==
Galduva Aranya (Sri Gunawardhana Yogashramaya) in Kahawa, Ambalangoda, functions as the central administrative monastery and primary venue for monastic ordination ceremonies. Nimalawa Aranya Senasanaya at Kirinda was the first hermitage of the association, opened when the Sanstha was founded in 1951.

Associated hermitages include:

- Meetirigala Nissarana Vanaya – Hermitage where the first Maha Upajjhaya, Matara Sri Nanarama Mahathera, resided and instructed meditators.
- Nā Uyana Āranya – Expansive forest hermitage in Kurunegala District dedicated to strict Vinaya and meditation practice.

Other affiliated hermitages include Kudumbigala Aranya in the Ampara district, Nathagane Aranya in Kurunegala, Budugallena Aranya in Buttala, Koggala Aranya, Mahasen Aranya in Minneriya, Ruwangirikanda Aranya, and Galpiyuma Aranya in Padaviya.

== Chief mentors ==
The organisation's official lineage history lists five successive Maha Upajjhaya (chief preceptors):

1. Matara Nanarama Mahathera – first Maha Upajjhaya
2. Kadawedduwe Jinavamsa Mahathera – second Maha Upajjhaya and founder of the Sanstha
3. Mawatagama Gunananda Mahathera – third Maha Upajjhaya
4. Nauyane Ariyadhamma Mahathera – fourth Maha Upajjhaya
5. Pahalavitiyala Janananda Mahathera – fifth Maha Upajjhaya

== Other Notable Monks ==
- Gatamanne Vimalavansa Mahathera – Late abbot of Natagane Forest Monastery
- Asmandale Ratanapala Mahathera – A revolutionary monk who strictly refused the monks who are using money
- Madawala Dhamamatilaka Mahathera – Late abbot of Nimalawa Forest Monastery
- Matale Silarakkhita Mahathera – Late abbot of Ruwangirikanda Forest Monastery

== See also ==
- Sri Lankan Forest Tradition
- Rāmañña Nikāya
- Amarapura–Rāmañña Nikāya
