= Samanera =

Buddhist ordained novices

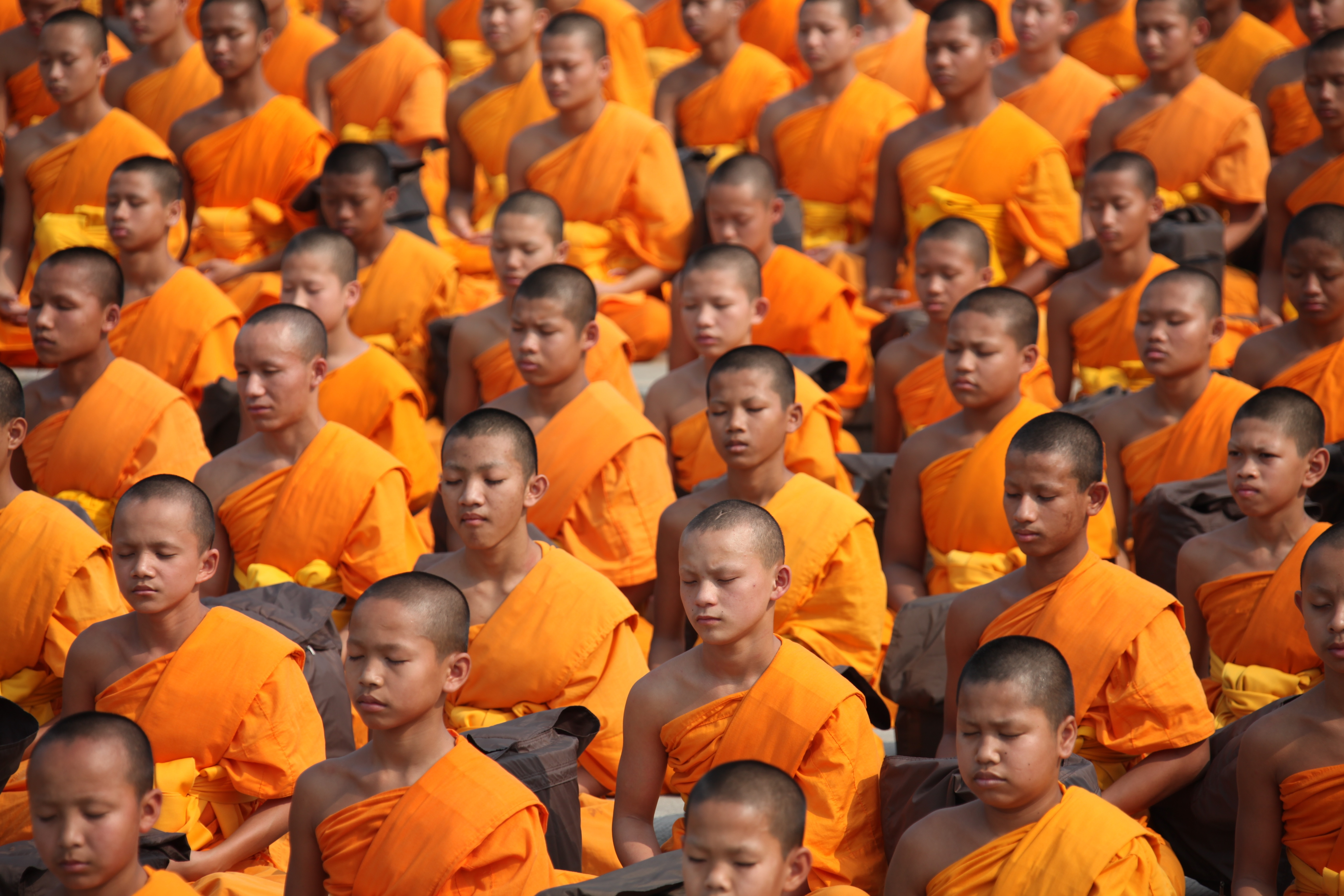
Sāmaṇeras from Theravada Buddhism, Thailand

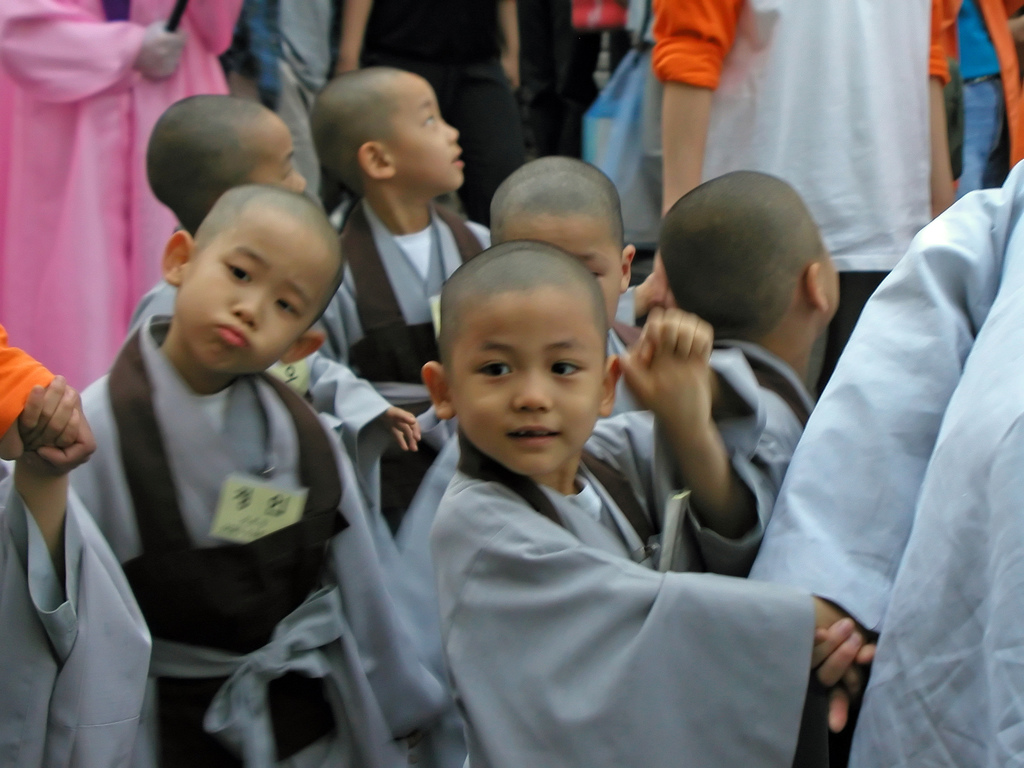
Sāmaṇeras from the Jogye Order of Korean Seon

A sāmaṇera (Pali; Sanskrit: 𑀰𑁆𑀭𑀸𑀫𑀡𑁂𑀭, romanized: śrāmaṇera) is a novice male monastic in Buddhism. A novice female monastic is a sāmaṇerī, in Sanskrit śrāmaṇerī or śrāmaṇerikā.

== Etymology ==
The sāmaṇera is a diminutive equivalent to the Sanskrit term śrāmaṇera, which indicates an ascetic practitioner. Therefore, sāmaṇera might be said to mean "small or young renunciate (ascetic)". In some South and Southeast Asian Buddhist traditions, the term refers to someone who has taken the initial pabbajjā (Sakata: pravrajyā) vows but not upasampadā (full ordination). The pratimokṣa rules do not apply to them, and they do not take part in the recital of the rules on uposatha days.

The Sanskrit word śrāmaṇerikā is the feminine form of Sanskrit: śrāmaṇera.

== History ==
The account provided in the literature of South Asian Buddhism (and adopted by other Buddhist traditions) is that when Gautama Buddha's son Rāhula was seven years old, he followed the Buddha, saying "Give me my inheritance." The Buddha called Sariputta and asked him to ordain Rāhula, who became the first sāmaṇera.

The King (Suddhodana), discovering that now his grandson and a number of young men in the royal family had requested ordination, asked the Buddha only to ordain a minor with the consent of his parents or guardian. The Buddha assented. This rule was expanded to include the spouses of those intending to join the Order of monks and nuns.

== Overview ==
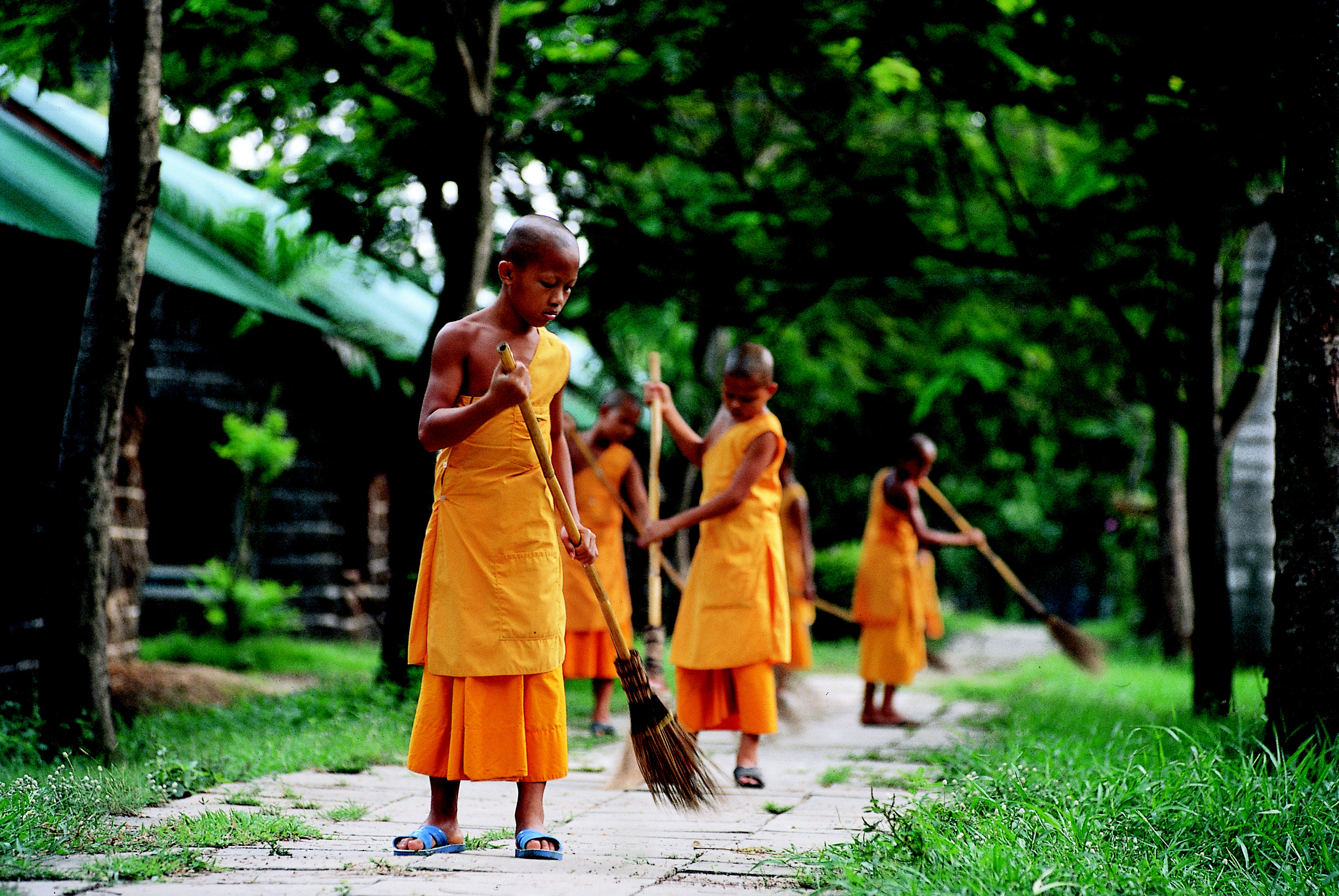
Thai novices sweeping temple grounds

In the Vinaya (monastic regulations), used by many South Asian Buddhist sects, a man under the age of 20 cannot be ordained as a bhikṣu (monk) but can be ordained as a sāmaṇera. Sāmaṇeras (and sāmaṇerīs – the equivalent term for women) live according to the Ten Precepts and devote themselves to religious service during breaks from secular schooling, or in conjunction with it if they are devoted to formal ordination. In other cultures and Buddhist traditions (particularly in Northeast Asia, and in those in the West that derive from these lineages), monks take different sets of vows and follow different customary rules.

The Ten Precepts upheld by sāmaṇeras are:

1. Refrain from killing or harming living things.
2. Refrain from stealing.
3. Refrain from unchastity (sensuality, sexuality, lust).
4. Refrain from lying.
5. Refrain from taking intoxicants.
6. Refrain from taking food at inappropriate times (after noon).
7. Refrain from singing, dancing, playing music, or attending entertainment programs (performances).
8. Refrain from wearing perfume, cosmetics, and garland (decorative accessories).
9. Refrain from sitting on high chairs and sleeping on luxurious, soft beds.
10. Refrain from accepting money.

Ordination requirements differs between sāmaṇeras and srāmaṇerīs.

== Transition to full ordination ==
After a year or at the age of 20, a sāmaṇera will be considered for the upasampada or higher ordination as a bhikṣu. Some monasteries will require people who want to ordain as a monk to be a novice for a set period of time, as a period of preparation and familiarization.

== Ordination of women ==
The novice ordination of women, according to the traditional vinaya, is conferred by monks, and by nuns when possible. Novice nuns (Standard Tibetan: getsulma, or Sanskrit: śrāmaṇeras and śrāmaṇeris) honor their vows of the Ten Precepts as their code of behaviour.

After a year or at the age of 20, a novice nun can be ordained as a full bhikṣuṇī (Pali: bhikkhunī). The ordination rituals depend on the nun's specific tradition of Buddhism, while the number of their precepts increases substantially.

== In Myanmar ==
In Myanmar (Burma), sāmaṇera are known as shin thamane (ရှင်သာမဏေ) or thamane (သာမဏေ). In Burmese culture, young Buddhist boys traditionally ordain as sāmaṇeras for a period of time, as a rite of passage called shinbyu; this is considered one of the Twelve Auspicious Rites. In 2016, Myanmar had 252,962 sāmaṇeras.

Burmese sāmaṇeras by region, 2016
1. Shan State 57,850 (22.9%)
2. Mandalay Region 47,217 (18.7%)
3. Yangon Region 36,654 (14.5%)
4. Sagaing Region 25,050 (9.90%)
5. Bago Region 18,032 (7.13%)
6. Ayeyarwady Region 15,377 (6.08%)
7. Magwe Region 13,654 (5.40%)
8. Mon State 13,466 (5.32%)
9. Rakhine State 6,395 (2.53%)
10. Kayin State 5,967 (2.36%)
11. Naypyitaw 5,713 (2.26%)
12. Kachin State 3,121 (1.23%)
13. Tanintharyi Region 3,009 (1.19%)
14. Kayah State 1,300 (0.51%)
15. Chin State 157 (0.06%)

== See also ==
- Anagarika
- International Congress on Buddhist Women's Role in the Sangha
- Maechi
- Nun
- World Buddhist Sangha Council
- Ordination
- Sangha
- Poy Sang Long
- Shinbyu
- Śikṣamāṇā
- Unsui
