= Bhaddanta Āciṇṇa =

Theravāda Buddhist monk

Bhaddanta The Most Venerable Bhaddanta Āciṇṇa Mahāthēra
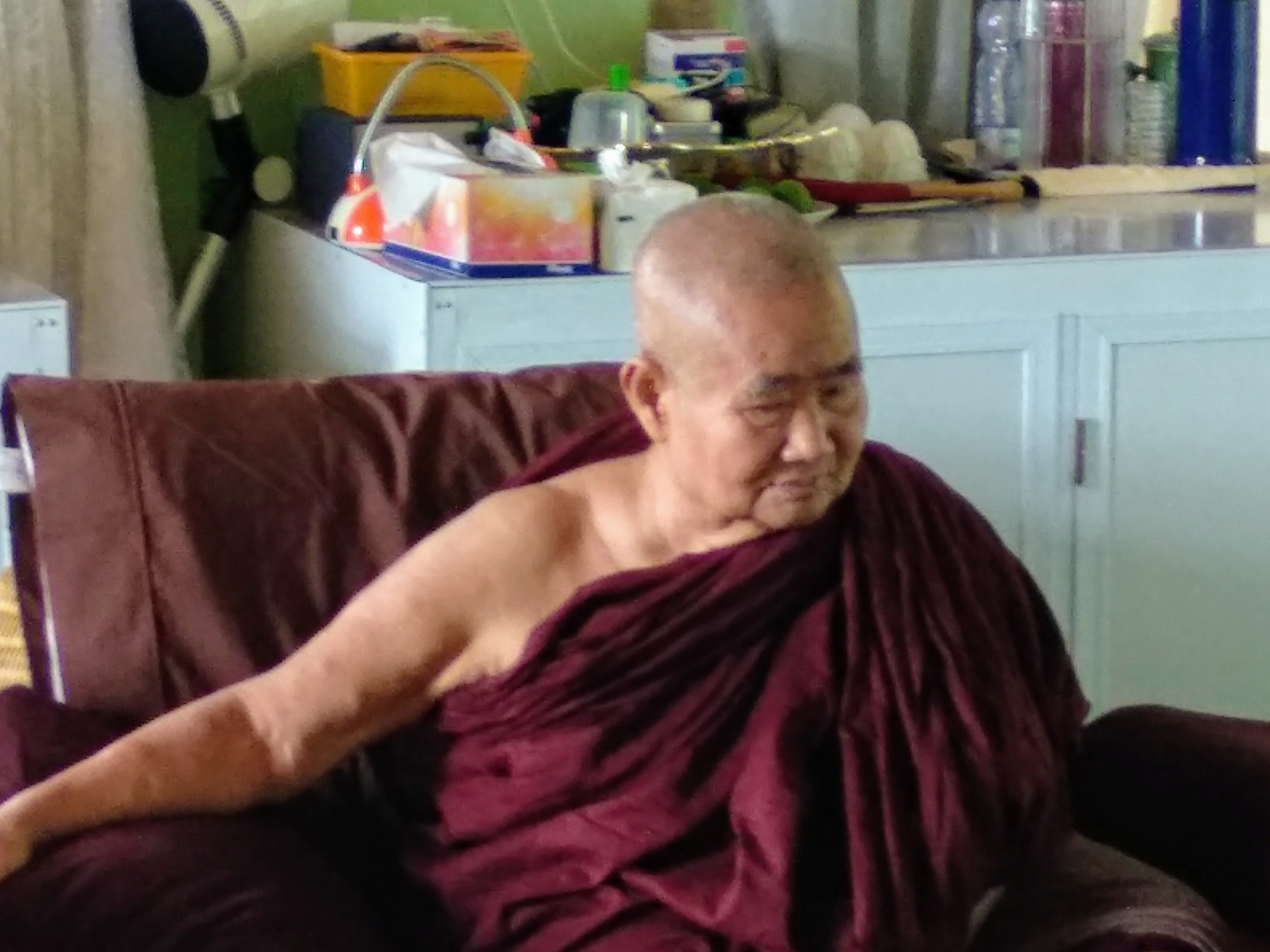
- Title: Dhammācariya (1956), Aggamahā Kammaṭṭhānācariya (1999), Shwegyin Nikaya Rattaññūmahānāyaka (2009), Abhidhaja Aggamahā Saddhammajotika (2018), Aggamahāpaṇḍita (2021), Abhidhajamahāraṭṭhaguru (2024)

Personal life
- Born: June 24, 1934 (age 92) Hinthada Township, Ayeyarwady, Myanmar
- Parents: U Phyu (father); Daw Saw Tin (mother)
- Notable work: The Practice That Leads to Nibbāna
- Other name: Pa-Auk Sayadaw
- Occupation: Monk
- Website: www.paaukforestmonastery.org

Religious life
- Religion: Buddhism
- Order: Shwegyin Nikāya
- School: Theravāda
- Dharma name: Āciṇṇa အာစိဏ္ဏ
- Ordination: May 10, 1954 (72 years ago)
- Initiation: May 2, 1944 by U Soṇa

Senior posting
- Teacher: Mahasi Sayadaw, U Paṇḍitā
- Based in: Mawlamyine, Mon State; Pyin U Lwin, Mandalay
- Predecessor: Aggapañña
- Students: Most Ven. Nauyane Ariyadhamma Mahāthēra, Shaila Catherine

The Most Venerable Bhaddanta Āciṇṇa Mahāthēra (ဘဒ္ဒန္တအာစိဏ္ဏ), more commonly referred to as the Pa-Auk Sayadaw (Burmese: ဖားအောက်ဆရာတော်, MLCTS: Hpa:auk Hca.ratau.), is a Burmese Theravāda monk, meditation teacher and the abbot of the Pa-Auk Forest Monastery in Mawlamyine.

Most Venerable Āciṇṇa Mahāthēra ordained as a novice in 1944, receiving full ordination in 1954. Immersed in the study of the Pāli Canon from his days as a novice, he gradually broadened his scope of attention to include meditation, initially training under Mahasi Sayadaw and U Paṇḍitā. Not long after, he would also decide to become a forest monk. In the months and years to follow, he would deepen his meditation abilities under the Kathitwaing, Thanlyin and Shwetheindaw sayadaws, eventually developing his own set of meditation methods, often collectively referred to as the "Pa-Auk Method".

On July 21, 1981, Most Venerable Āciṇṇa Mahāthēra succeeded the Phelhtaw Sayadaw Aggapañña, at the latter's invitation, as the abbot of the Pa-Auk Forest Monastery. The monastery would then grow into a network of meditation centres across Southeast Asia and beyond, and is currently the largest network in Myanmar.

== Awards and honours ==
In 1999, the national government awarded Āciṇṇa the title of Aggamahākammaṭṭhānācariya (အဂ္ဂမဟာကမ္မဋ္ဌာနာစရိယ). In 2018, his title was raised to that of Abhidhaja Aggamahā Saddhammajotika (အဘိဓဇအဂ္ဂမဟာသဒ္ဓမ္မဇောတိက). In 2021, he received the title Aggamahāpandita (အဂ္ဂမဟာပဏ္ဍိတ) and in 2024, he received the highest title, Abhidhajamahāraṭṭhaguru (အဘိဓဇမဟာရဋ္ဌဂုရု).

In May 2017, Āciṇṇa was conferred an honorary doctorate of philosophy from Mahachulalongkornrajavidyalaya University in Bangkok, Thailand.

== English Publications ==
- Sayadaw, Pa-Auk Tawya (2019). Knowing and Seeing (5th rev. ed.). ISBN 978-981-14-0685-0.
- Sayadaw, Pa-Auk Tawya (2018). The Workings of Kamma (2nd rev. ed.). ISBN 978-981-07-3512-8.
- Sayadaw, Pa-Auk Tawya (2013). Mindfulness of Breathing (Ānāpāna·Ssati) (2nd rev. ed.). ISBN 978-981-07-3328-5.
- Sayadaw, Pa-Auk Tawya (2012). The Only Way for the Realization of Nibbāna. ISBN 978-981-07-5193-7.

== Burmese Language Published Books ==
The Dhamma books of the Venerable Abbot of Pa-Auk Forest Monastery are:

1. Devotion and Reliance (1)
2. Devotion and Reliance (2)
3. The Buddha Comparable to the Lotus
4. Aspiring to the Radiant Moon Form
5. Mind’s Diminishing Tone
6. Mental Attitude Transformation – Second Edition
7. Mental Attitude Transformation
8. Clear the Forest but Do Not Cut Down the Trees
9. Towards Eternal Peace
10. Theravāda Dhamma Discourses
11. The Wheel of Dhamma and Vipassanā Teachings
12. The Power of Understanding
13. Path Leading to Nibbāna (1)
14. Path Leading to Nibbāna (2)
15. Path Leading to Nibbāna (3)
16. Path Leading to Nibbāna (4)
17. Path Leading to Nibbāna (5)
18. The Only Path to Nibbāna
19. Mahānāmakkāra Chanting – Second Edition
20. Mahānāmakkāra Chanting – Third Edition
21. History of Fa-Auk Forest Monastery
22. Do Not Hate
23. The Power of Loving-Kindness and Buddha Recollection
24. Keep the Noble Aim Unbroken
25. Remember and Observe the Vinaya
26. Those with the Water Simile and What People Are Doing
27. The Way Out for the Foolish
28. Angels Known in Human Villages and the Gathering of the Ignorant
29. Observe the World as Void
30. Accepting the Heritage of the Sāsana
31. The Donations of the Virtuous
32. When Death Approaches in Various Postures
33. Prince of the Bronze Palace
34. So-Called Fat and Filth
35. Samatha Meditation Section (A) – Volume 1
36. Samatha Meditation Section (B) – Volume 2
37. Material Meditation Section – Volume 3
38. Mental Meditation Section – Volume 4
39. Dependent Origination Section (A) – Volume 5
40. Dependent Origination Section (B) – Volume 6
41. Patthāna Conditional Relations Section – Volume 7
42. Characteristics and Tetrads Section – Volume 8
43. Vipassanā Meditation Section – Volume 9
44. To Whom Should One Give?
45. Four Questions and Four Answers
46. The Great Power Leading Swiftly to Nibbāna (7 Points) – 2013
47. The Great Power Leading Swiftly to Nibbāna (7 Points)
48. The Noble Ones Have Left the Forest
49. Three Dangers Blocking the Root of Giving
50. Ānāpāna Practice – Introductory Guide
51. From Ānāpāna Practice to Vipassanā
52. Collections of Dhamma Teachings
