= Upasampadā =

Buddhist higher ordination ceremony

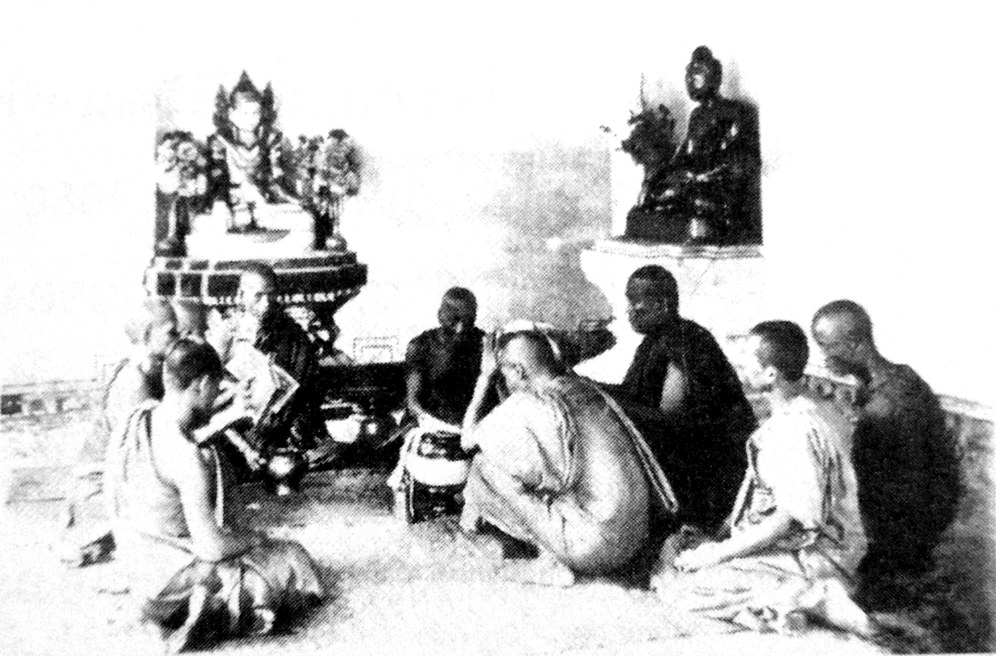
Upasampadā of a Buddhist monk in Burma

Upasampadā (Pali) literally denotes "approaching or nearing the ascetic tradition." In more common parlance it specifically refers to the rite and ritual of ascetic vetting (ordination) by which a candidate, if deemed acceptable, enters the community as upasampadān (ordained) and is authorised to undertake ascetic life.

According to Buddhist monastic codes (Vinaya), a person must be 20 years old in order to become a monk or nun. A person under the age of 20 years cannot undertake upasampadā (i.e., become a monk (bhikkhu) or nun (bhikkhuni)), but can become a novice (m. samanera, f. samaneri). After a year or at the age of 20, a novice will be considered for upasampadā.

Traditionally, the upasampadā ritual is performed within a well-demarcated and consecrated area called sima (sima malaka) and needs to be attended by a specified number of monks: "ten or even five in a remoter area".

== Regional variations ==
Customs regarding upasampada vary between regional traditions. In the Theravada tradition, monastics typically undertake higher ordination as soon as they are eligible. In East Asia, it is more typical for monastics to defer or avoid upasampada ordination entirely, remaining novices (samanera) for most or all of their monastic careers. This difference may originate from the historical shortage of temples in East Asia able to provide higher ordination according to the Vinaya.

== See also ==
- Pabbajjā: "going forth," novice ordination, entering the condition of mendicancy.
- Shinbyu: Novitiation ceremony for young Burmese boys
- Poy Sang Long: Novitiation ceremony for young Shan boys
- Ordination hall
- Bai Sema: Sima boundary stones in Thai Buddhist temples
- Pāṭimokkha: Basic code of monastic discipline
- Refuge in Buddhism
