= Pabbajjā =

Living the life of renunciate in Buddhist monastic community

Pabbajjā (Pali; Skt.: pravrajyā) literally means "to go forth" and refers to an ordination in Buddhism when a layperson leaves home to live the life of a Buddhist renunciate among a community of bhikkhus (fully ordained monks). This generally involves preliminary ordination as a novice (m. samanera, f. samaneri). It is sometimes referred to as "lower ordination". It is the ceremony that precedes the upasampadā ordination and allows the novice to experience monastic life for the first time. After a period or when the novice reaches 20 years of age, the novice can be considered for the upasampadā ordination (or "higher ordination") whereby the novice becomes a monk (bhikkhu) or nun (bhikkhuni). It has been used in pre-Buddhist religions along with traditions of later Buddhism. The role of pabbajjā to become a samanera is a way to train oneself in separation to experience spiritual transformation.

The term pabbajjā refers to withdrawing from worldly affairs and social obligations. This practice of renunciation has been a well-established way of life for those seeking spiritual liberation, even before the emergence of Buddhism. Individuals who chose this path often did so in pursuit of the brahmacharya lifestyle. These renunciants typically lived in solitude or as part of a community, and would depend on alms for sustenance. These renunciants were often mendicants and ascetics, and were already present in spiritual traditions predating the Buddhist era.

In some traditional Theravada countries, such as Myanmar, boys undergo pabbajjā (Shinbyu) at the age of puberty. In Mahayana countries such as China and Japan, the pabbajjā is preceded by a probationary study period.

== Ceremony for male applicants ==
The ceremony differs in various countries. The candidate must be under 20 years old and have their parents' permission. Typically, the applicant stands before a group of monks and asks permission to join as a novice. The applicant must then shave his head and face, and wear ochre robes. The applicant repeats the Three Refuges and then follows the Buddhist ethics:

1. Intention for the applicant to shave his head
2. Shave his head and face
3. Have the applicant put on ochre robes
4. Have the applicant place the upper robe on one shoulder
5. Have the applicant pay his respects at the bhikkhus’ feet
6. Have the applicant squat down
7. Have the applicant place his palms together
8. Have the applicant repeat the Three Refuges

The ceremony ends with the applicant paying his respects to the monks and asking for forgiveness for his wrongdoings.

After the ceremony, the novice becomes a samanera and follows the Ten Precepts. He also lives in the monastery for a period ranging from a few days to months. During this time, he follows a monk, but isn’t allowed to partake in the recitation of the pāṭimokkha. The novice has a spiritual teacher who punishes him through restriction when necessary. However, the novice should not be restricted from entering the temple or from food or water.

== Ceremony for female applicants ==
The ceremony is relatively the same for female candidates. Like the male candidates, they must be under 20 years old, repeat the Three Refuges, and follow the Ten Precepts once they become a samaneri. Females also follow a probationary period until they reach a certain age.

== Sources ==
- Encyclopædia Britannica (2007a). "Pabbajjā." Retrieved 26 September 2007 from "Encyclopædia Britannica Online" at http://www.britannica.com/eb/article-9057892.
- Encyclopædia Britannica (2007b). "Upasampadā." Retrieved 26 September 2007 from "Encyclopædia Britannica Online" at http://www.britannica.com/eb/article-9074384.
