= Mahanayaka =

Mahanayaka Theros of the Three Nikayas
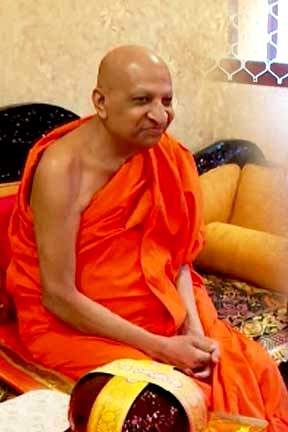
- Mahanayaka Thera – Siam Nikaya (Malwathu Chapter)

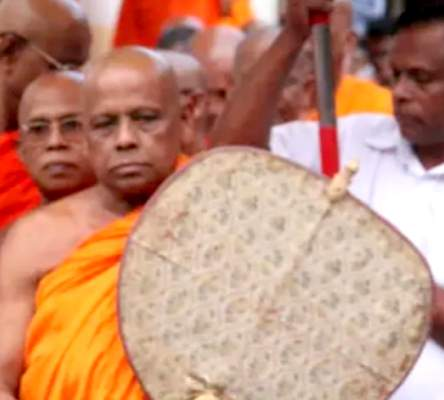
- Mahanayaka Thera – Siam Nikaya (Asgiri Chapter)

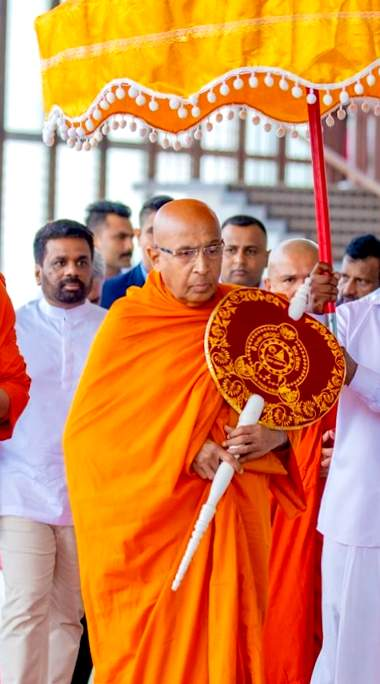
- Supreme Mahanayaka Thera – Amarapura Sangha Sabha

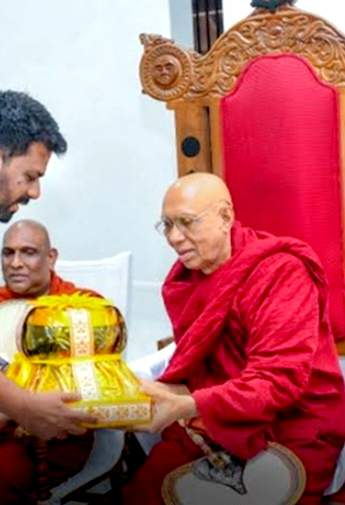
- Mahanayaka Thera – Ramanna Nikaya

① Siam Nikaya (Malwathu Chapter)
- Name: Thibbatuwawe Sri Siddhartha Sumangala Thera
- Position: Mahanayaka Thera
- Term: 2004–present

② Siam Nikaya (Asgiri Chapter)
- Name: Warakagoda Gnanarathana Thera
- Position: Mahanayaka Thera
- Term: 2017–present

③ Sri Lanka Amarapura Maha Sangha Sabha
- Name: Karagoda Uyangoda Maithri Murthy Thera
- Position: Supreme Mahanayaka Thera
- Term: 2024–present

④ Sri Lanka Ramanna Maha Nikaya
- Name: Makulewe Wimala Thera
- Position: Mahanayaka Thera
- Term: 2022–present

Mahanayaka (also spelled as Maha Nayaka, Maha Nayake) Theras are high-ranking Buddhist monks who oversee and regulate the Buddhist clergy in Theravada Buddhist countries. The title Maha Nayaka translates to English as 'Great Leader' and it is considered to be a very important position held by a monk in a Theravada Buddhist country. It is usually bestowed upon the senior Buddhist monks who are appointed the Chief Prelates of monastic fraternities known as Nikayas.

== Sri Lankan tradition ==
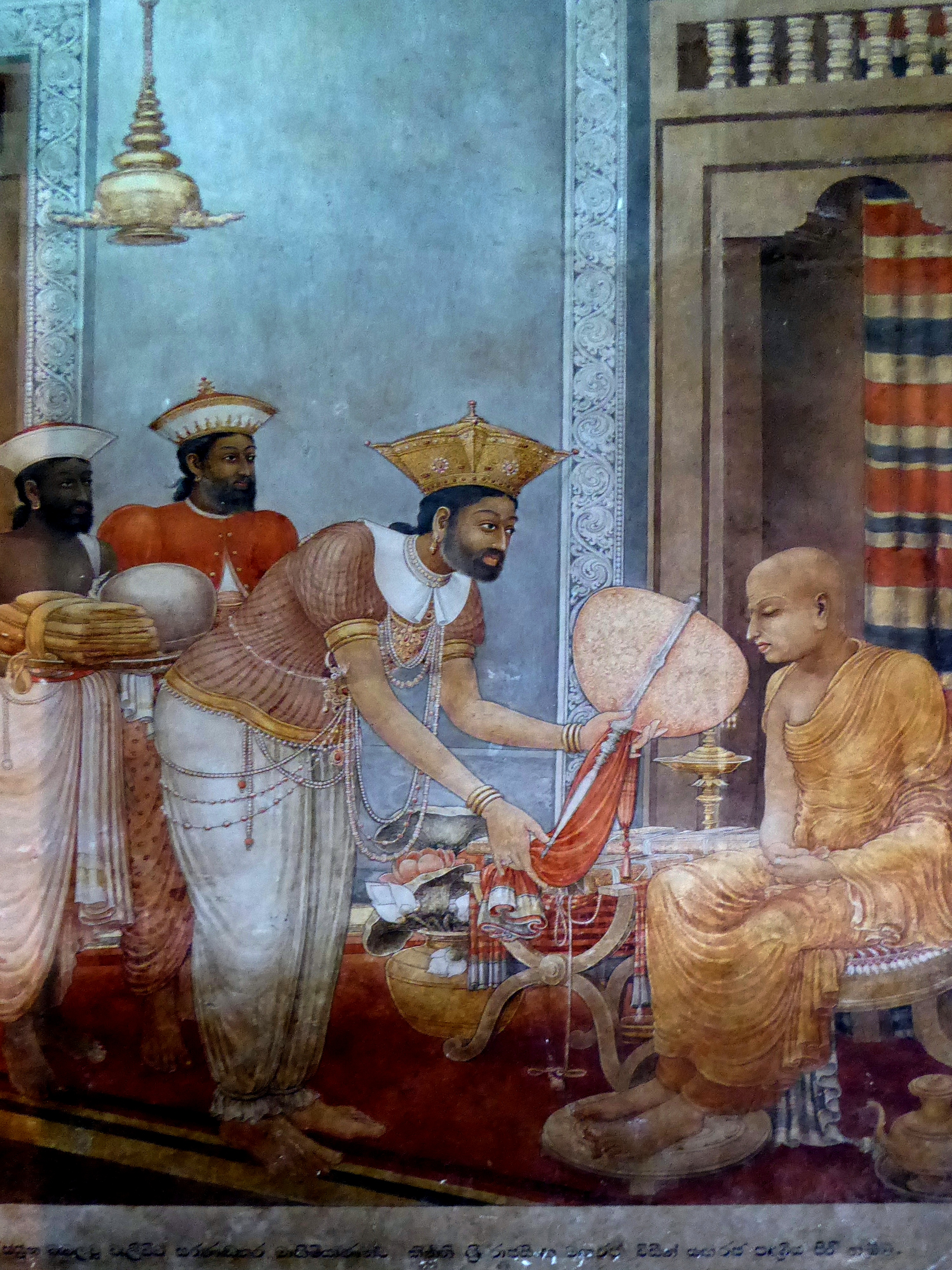
Mahanayaka position in Sri Lanka was formed with the re-establishment of Upasampada in 1753 on the initiatives taken by Sangharaja Weliwita Sri Saranankara Thera during the reign of King Kirti Sri Rajasinha.

In Sri Lankan Buddhist tradition, the title Mahanayaka is held by the heads of the chapters of all three main sects, Siam Nikaya (Estd. 1753), Amarapura Nikaya (Estd. 1803) and Ramanna Nikaya (Estd. 1864). Appointment of senior Buddhist monks to the Mahanayaka position in Sri Lanka began with the re-establishment of Upasampada higher ordination in 1753 on the initiatives taken by Sangharaja Weliwita Sri Saranankara Thera during the reign of King of Kandy Kirti Sri Rajasinha.

The deputies of Mahanayaka Theras are known as Anunayaka Theras (also spelled as Anu Nayaka), who generally succeed to the Mahanayaka position, after a death of an incumbent monk. Next in the hierarchy are Chief Sanghanayaka Theras (also spelled as Sangha Nayaka), who have the jurisdiction over monks in a region, province or a district, while the Nayaka Theras have the precedence in a temple or a group of connected temples. Prominent Mahanayake Theras who are presently in office and their immediate predecessors are listed below.

=== Present Mahanayaka Theras ===
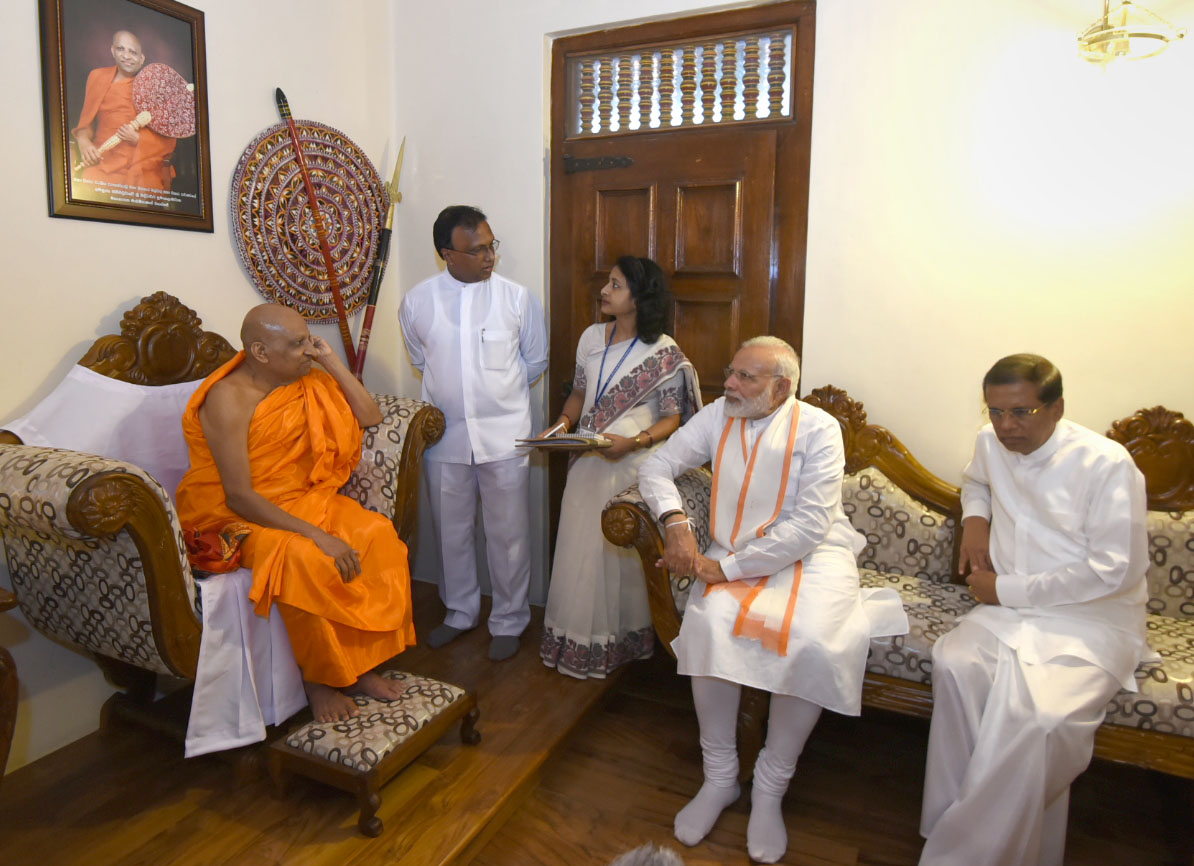
Most Ven. Sri Siddhartha Sumangala Maha Nayaka Thera having a discussion with prime minister of India and president of Sri Lanka.

- Most Ven. Thibbatuwawe Sri Siddhartha Sumangala Thera – Mahanayaka of the Malwatta Chapter of Siyam Nikaya
- Most Ven. Warakagoda Sri Gnanarathana Thera – Mahanayaka of the Asgiriya Chapter of Siyam Nikaya
- Most Ven. Karagoda Uyangoda Maithri Murthy Thera – Supreme Mahanayaka of Amarapura Maha Sangha Sabha
- Most Ven. Makulawe Wimala Thera – Mahanayaka of Sri Lanka Ramanna Nikaya

=== Former Mahanayaka Theras ===
Some of the former Mahanayke Theras who have died in recent years are listed below.

- Most Ven. Dodampahala Chandrasiri Thera – Former Supreme Mahanayaka of Amarapura Nikaya
- Most Ven. Kotugoda Dhammawasa Thera – Former Supreme Mahanayaka of Amarapura Nikaya
- Most Ven. Napana Pemasiri Thera – Former Mahanayaka of the Sri Lanka Ramanna Nikaya
- Most Ven. Galagama Sri Aththadassi Thera – Former Mahanayaka of the Asgiriya Chapter of Siyam Nikaya.
- Most Ven. Udugama Sri Buddharakkitha Thera – Former Mahanayaka of the Asgiriya Chapter of Siyam Nikaya
- Most Ven. Rambukwelle Sri Vipassi Thera – Former Mahanayake of the Malwatta Chapter of Siyam Nikaya
- Most Ven. Davuldena Sri Gnanissara Thera – Former Supreme Mahanayaka of Amarapura Nikaya
- Most Ven. Weweldeniye Medhalankara Thera – Former Mahanayake of the Sri Lanka Ramanna Nikaya

=== Privileges ===
The Mahanayaka Theras of the Malwatta Chapter and Asgiriya Chapter were traditionally referred by the Sri Lankan Government as the head of the Buddhist clergy in the country. As such certain state privileges have been extended since Sri Lanka gained independence in 1948. These include state provisions for official residences (aramayas), official vehicles and state funerals. With the formation of Supreme Mahanayaka post of Amarapura Nikaya in 1969, state patronage has been extended to the Mahanayaka Theras of Amarapura and Ramanna Nikayas as well.

== See also ==
- Agga Maha Pandita
- Buddhism in Sri Lanka
- Sangharaja
- Sangha Supreme Council
- State Saṅgha Mahā Nāyaka Committee
- Supreme Patriarch of Thailand
- Supreme Patriarch of Cambodia
- Thathanabaing of Burma
- Diyawadana Nilame of Sri Dalada Maligawa, Kandy
