= Asgiri Maha Viharaya =

Buddhist monastery in Sri Lanka

Asgiri Maha Vihara
- අස්ගිරි මහා විහාරය

Religion
- Affiliation: Buddhism
- District: Kandy
- Province: Central Province

Location
- Location: Kandy, Sri Lanka
- Interactive map of Asgiri Maha Vihara
- Coordinates: 07°17′56.0″N 80°37′58.3″E

Architecture
- Type: Buddhist Temple
- Completed: 1302
- Archaeological Protected Monument of Sri Lanka
- Designated: 13 March 1970

Asgiri Maha Viharaya (also called Asgiriya Temple, Asgiriya Gedige) is a Buddhist monastery located in Kandy, Sri Lanka. It is the headquarters of the Asgiriya Chapter of Siyam Nikaya, one of the two Buddhist monasteries that holds the custodianship of sacred tooth relic of Buddha kept in Sri Dalada Maligawa, Kandy. The Chief Incumbent of the Asgiri Maha Viharaya is the Mahanayaka Thera of Asgiri Chapter of Siyam Nikaya, a leading Buddhist monastic fraternity in Sri Lanka. The present Chief Incumbent of Asgiri Maha Viharaya is Warakagoda Sri Gnanarathana Thera. Asgiri Maha Vihara traces its origin from the Wanavasi sect of the Dimbulagala Forest Monastery of Polonnaruva. Currently, 565 Buddhist temples in Sri Lanka function under Asgiri Viharaya of Kandy.

== History ==
Asgiri Maha Viharaya was founded by Commander Siriwardhana on the instructions of Parakramabahu IV of Kurunegala (1305–1335 A.D.). Situated north of the Kandy Lake, this temple is believed to be considerably older than the Malwathu Maha Viharaya, the other monastic centre of the Siyam Nikaya. The original buildings were set up in the premises of present-day Trinity College. The Buddhist monks who took residence in this monastery were sent from Valasgala hermitage in Yapahuwa.

The name Valasgala is translated into Pali as "Acchagiri" and the present Sinhalese name Asgiri is derived from it. According to another legend Asgiri was named after queen Chandrawathie, the mother of king Vikramabahu who was cremated in the cremation ground of Adahana Maluva at Asgiriya. In the history of Kandyan Kingdom many kings have contributed much for the development of Asgiri Viharaya. The monks of Asgiriya Chapter have often safeguarded the tooth relic on behalf of the ruling monarch during troublesome times such as invasions and rebellions.

Asgiriya Monastery consists of the "Purana Viharaya" or the 'old temple', "Meda Pansala" or the 'middle temple', the "Aluth Viharaya" or the 'new temple' and the "Gedige Vihara". The middle temple known today as "Meda Pansala" was built by Meegastanne Dissawe of Dumbara in 1767 and the new temple was built by Pilimathalawe Dissawe a year later in 1768. Parana Viharaya or the old temple contains a serene statue of Buddha under a Makara Thorana (Dragon Arch), and the interior is very similar to that of Gedige Viharaya. There are also two statues of deities "Natha" and "Saman" to the right and left side of the Buddha statue respectively. A new "Aluth Viharaya" or the new temple was modified by Pilimathalawe Adhikaram, a son of Pilimathalawe Dissawe in 1801. Asgiri Viharaya also consists of a recumbent Buddha statue carved out of rock, which is thirty six feet in length and two 'poya ge's, which are used as the assembly halls for the meetings of the monastic fraternity.

== Adahana Maluwa ==
One of the other historically important sites standing in the Asgiri Maha Vihara premises is the "Adahana Maluwa" or the Royal Cremation Ground of Kandyan Kingdom. The viharaya had three "maluwas" or terraces, Uda Maluwa (upper terrace), Meda Maluwa (centre terrace), Palle Maluwa (lower terrace). The cremation of the Royal Family members were done at the Meda Maluwa, therefore the temple in the premises was known as the "Adahanamaluwa Gedige Viharaya". Adahana Maluva was the place where the bodies of the Kings of Kandy and their family members were burned and their remains were buried. Historically, Adahanamaluwa Gedige is the second oldest structure in Kandy and architecturally it has similarities to the structures of Natha Devale, Kandy and Gadaladeniya Vihara in Uda Nuwara. During 1878–80 period, the railway line to Matale was constructed by the British colonial government. One of the tunnels of this railway line was constructed below the Adahana Maluva of Asgiri Vihara. The construction work of this tunnel destroyed the last remains of the tombs which were remaining in the Royal Burial Grounds.

== Chief Incumbents ==
The following is a list of Chief Incumbents of Asgiri Maha Viharaya, Kandy who are also the Mahanayaka Theras of Asgiriya Chapter of Siyam Nikaya. Appointment of senior Buddhist monks to the Mahanayaka position in Sri Lanka began with the re-establishment of Upasampada in 1753 on the initiatives taken by Sangharaja Weliwita Sri Saranankara Thera during the reign of King of Kandy Kirti Sri Rajasinha.

1. Urulewatte Sri Dhamma Siddhi Thera (1753–1778) – උරුලෑවත්තේ ශ්‍රී ධම්මසිද්ධි මහා ථේර
2. Idawalugoda Sri Dhammapala Thera (1778–1807) – ඉඩවලුගොඩ ශ්‍රී ධම්මපාල මහා ථේර
3. Pothuhera Sri Rathanapala Thera (1807–1815) – පොතුහැර ශ්‍රී රතනපාල මහා ථේර
4. Mawathagama Sri Shobitha Thera (1815–1822) – මාවතගම ශ්‍රී සෝභිත මහා ථේර
5. Yatawatte Sri Chandajothi Thera (1822–1822) – යටවත්තේ ශ්‍රී චන්දජෝති මහා ථේර
6. Vacant (1822–1824)
7. Yatanwala Sri Sunanda Thera (1824–1835) – යටන්වල ශ්‍රී සුනන්ද මහා ථේර
8. Kotagama Sri Gunarathana Thera (1835–1845) – කොටගම ශ්‍රී ඤානරතන මහා ථේර
9. Vacant (1845–1849)
10. Udumulle Sri Rathanajothi Thera (1849–1851) – උඩුමුල්ලේ ශ්‍රී රතනජෝති මහා ථේර
11. Vacant (1851–1853)
12. Yatawatte Sri Swarnajothi Thera (1853–1868) – යටවත්තේ ශ්‍රී ස්වර්ණජෝති මහා ථේර
13. Wattegama Sri Sumangala Thera (1869–1885) – වතේගම ශ්‍රී සුමංගල මහා ථේර
14. Yatawatte Sri Chandajothi Thera (1886–1892) – යටවත්තේ ශ්‍රී චන්ද්‍රජෝති මහා ථේර
15. Kapuliyadde Sri Piyadassi Thera (1893–1914) – කපුලියද්දේ ශ්‍රී පියදස්සි මහා ථේර
16. Abagaswewe Sri Rathanajothi Thera (1914–1921) – අඹගස්වැවේ ශ්‍රී රතනජෝති මහා ථේර
17. Gunnepane Sri Saranankara Thera (1921–1929) – ගුන්නෑපානේ ශ්‍රී සරණංකර මහා ථේර
18. Mullegama Sri Gunarathana Thera (1929–1947) – මුල්ලේගම ශ්‍රී ඤානරතන මහා ථේර
19. Yatawatte Sri Dhammarathana Thera (1947–1966) – යටවත්තේ ශ්‍රී ධර්මරතන මහා ථේර
20. Udugama Sri Rathanapala Thera (1966–1970) – උඩුගම ශ්‍රී රතනපාල මහා ථේර
21. Godamune Sri Nagasena Dhammananda Thera – (1970–1975) ගොඩමුනේ ශ්‍රී නාගසේන ධම්මානන්ද මහා ථේර
22. Palipane Sri Chandananda Thera (1975–1999) – පලිපානේ ශ්‍රී චන්දානන්ද මහා ථේර
23. Udugama Sri Buddharakkitha Thera (1999–2015) – උඩුගම ශ්‍රී බුද්ධ රක්ඛිත මහා ථේර
24. Galagama Sri Aththadassi Thera (2015–2016) – ගලගම ශ්‍රී අත්තදස්සි මහා ථේර
25. Warakagoda Sri Gnanarathana Thera (2016–) – වරකාගොඩ ශ්‍රී ඤානරතන මහා ථේර

== See also ==
- Malwathu Maha Viharaya
