= Maha Gabadava =

In Sri Lankan architecture a Maha Gabadava ("Royal Storehouse") is a type of large granary in the form of a separate building from the main compound. In the Kandyan period the Sinhalese kings would send daily provisions from the Maha Gabadava to the two main monastic orders, the Malwathu Maha Viharaya and Asgiri Maha Viharaya. This was continued after the fall of the Kingdom of Kandy.
