= Thibbatuwawe Sri Siddhartha Sumangala Thera =

Sri Lankan (Sinhala) Buddhist monk (born 1944)

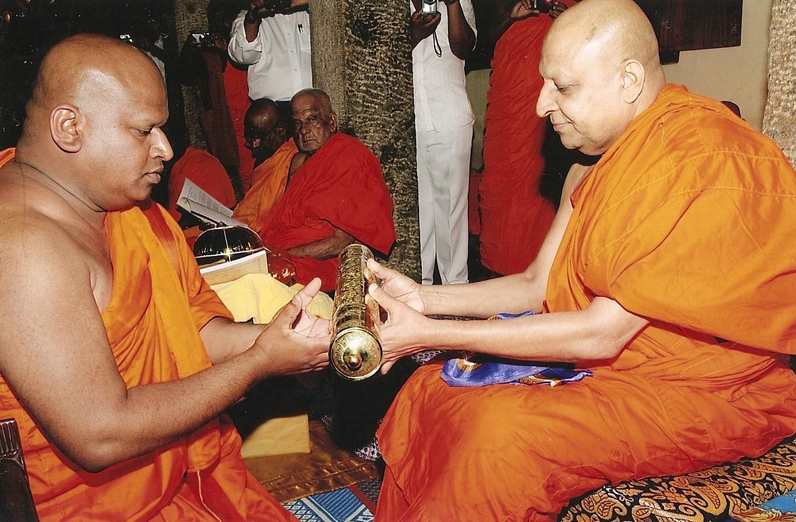
- Thibbatuwawe Sri Sumangala Maha Nayaka Thero presenting an honorary title.
- Title: Mahanayaka of the Malwatta Chapter of Siyam Nikaya

Personal life
- Born: 30 May 1944 (age 82) Thibbatuwawa, Matale District

Religious life
- Religion: Buddhism
- School: Theravada
- Lineage: Malwatta Chapter of Siyam Nikaya

Thibbatuwawe Sri Siddhartha Sumangala Thera (born 30 May 1944) is a Sri Lankan Buddhist monk who is the present Mahanayaka Thera of the Malwatta Chapter of Siam Nikaya. He was appointed as the 26th Mahanayke Thera of Malwatta Chapter on 20 June 2004, by the Karaka Sangha Sabha of Malwatta Chapter, after the demise of Most Ven. Rambukwelle Sri Dharmarakkitha Vipassi Mahanayaka Thera. His act of appointment was presented on 16 August 2004 at the historic Magul Maduwa in Kandy.

== Biography ==
Thibbatuwawe Sri Sumangala Thera was born on May 30, 1944, in the village Thibbatuwawe in "Kohonsiya Paththuwa" of Matale District. A descendant of a respected family, his father was Badnaranayake Wasala Mudali Tikiri Bandara Nilame of Thibbatuwawe Walauwa and his mother was Loku Kumarihamy of Karalliyadda Idame Walauwa. His lay name was Loku Bandara and was the youngest of the family with two elder sisters. Loku Bandara stayed with his grandparents from a young age and had his early education Werapitiya Kanishta Vidyalaya near Teldeniya, where his grandparents lived.

After his primary education Loku Bandara was ordained as a novice Buddhist monk Samanera, on 10 June 1957 at the age of 13 years under the tutelage of Most Ven. Purijjala Sri Siddhartha Saranankara Mahanayake Thera and Most Ven. Thibbatuwawe Sri Siddhartha Medankara Nayake Thera of Ridi Viharaya, Kurunegala. Thibbatuwawe Sri Sumangala Samanera entered the Sri Sangaraja Pirivena, Kandy for his monastic education where he studied the fundamentals of Buddhism, Sinhala, Pali, Sanskrit and traditional religious customs and mannerisms of the Malwatta Chapter under the guidance and tutelage of Most Ven. Amunugama Rajaguru Vipassi Mahanayake Thera of the Malwatta Chapter. He completed his higher education successfully and received his higher ordination at the age of 20 on June 10, 1964, under the guidance of then Mahanayake Thera of the Malwatta Chapter of Siyam Nikaya at the Seemamalakaya of Malwatta Maha Viharaya.

After the higher ordination he was entrusted with the Thewawa ceremony of the Sri Dalada Maligawa, which is a highly respected task among the Buddhist monks. He was appointed to perform these highly religious rituals in 1965, 1979, 1981 and 1992 under the guidance of the senior Buddhist monks at the time. Thibbatuwawe Sri Sumangala Thera was appointed to the Karaka Sanga Sabha, the highest administration body of the Malwatta Chapter in 1968, when he was only 24 years old, by the then Mahanayake Thera of the Malwatte Chapter. On 10 May 1979, he was unanimously appointed as the Upa Lekakadhikari (Assistant General Secretary) and in November 1985, to the post of Lekakadhikari (General Secretary) of the Malwatta Chapter of Siyam Nikaya. Thibbatuwawe Sri Sumangala Thera's performance of duties to the satisfaction, lead to his appointment as a Senior Member of the Karaka Sanga Sabha of the chapter on 5 January 1990, at the age of 45.

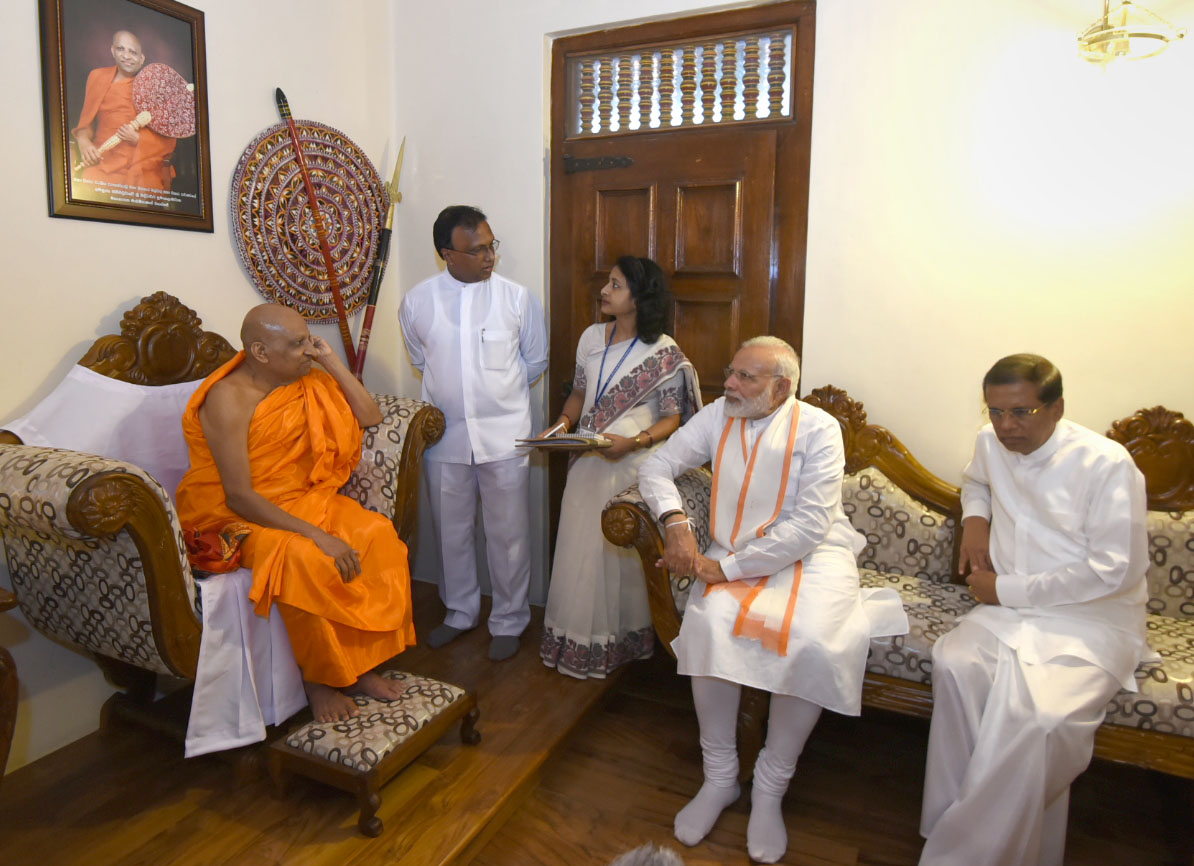
Most Ven. Thibbatuwawe Sri Siddhartha Sumangala Thera having a discussion with prime minister of India and president of Sri Lanka.

He was appointed to the prestigious position of Anunayake Thera (Deputy Chief Prelate) of the Malwatta Chapter on May 13, 1992, when Ven. Rambukwelle Sri Dharmarakkitha Anunayake Thera died. After serving as the Anu Nayaka of Malwatta Chapter for 12 years, Thibbatuwawe Sri Sumangala Thera was elevated to the position of Mahanayake Thera (Chief Prelate) of the Malwatta Chapter of Siyam Nikaya on 20 June 2004 by the Karaka Sanga Sabha, after the death of Most Ven. Rambukwelle Sri Vipassi Mahanayake Thera on 7 June 2004. Most Ven. Thibbatuwawe Sri Siddartha Sumangala Mahanayake Thera is the 26th Mahanayake Thera of Malwatta Chapter and his Act of Appointment was presented on 16 August 2004 at the historic Magul Maduwa in Kandy by the then Sri Lankan President Chandrika Bandaranaike Kumaratunga.

== See also ==
- Siyam Nikaya
- Diyawadana Nilame of Sri Dalada Maligawa, Kandy

Buddhist titles
Preceded by Rambukwelle Sri Vipassi Thera	Mahanayaka of the Malwatta Chapter of Siam Nikaya; 2004 – present	Incumbent
