= Sri Vijaya Rajasinha =

King of Kandy from 1739 to 1747

Sri Vijaya Rajasinha ශ්‍රී විජය රාජසිංහ
- Bhupathi; Lankeshwara; Thrisinhaladheeshwara

King of Kandy
- Reign: 13 May 1739 – 11 August 1747
- Coronation: 1739
- Predecessor: Vira Narendra Sinha
- Successor: Kirti Sri Rajasinha

Regent of Kandy
- Monarch: Vira Narendra Sinha
- Born: Kandy, Kingdom of Kandy, Sri Lanka
- Died: 11 August 1747; Sri Lanka
- Burial: Royal Cremation Yard, Asgiri Maha Viharaya, Kandy, Sri Lanka
- Spouse: Queen Consort of Madurai
- House: Nayaks of Kandy
- Father: Lord Pitti Nayakkar
- Mother: Lady Abhirami Devi
- Religion: Theravada Buddhism and Shaivite Hinduism

Vijaya Rajasinha (Sinhala: ශ්‍රී විජය රාජසිංහ, Tamil: விஜய ராஜசின்ஹா; reigned 1739–1747) was a member of the Madurai Nayak Dynasty and was the brother of Queen Pramila. He succeeded his brother-in-law Vira Narendra Sinha as the King of Kandy. He was raised in Kandy and was familiar with the politics and culture of the court and society at large, including those of his Telugu kinfolk.

He contracted marriages with an influential royal family from Madurai, and his father-in-law Narenappa Nayaka later became one of the most powerful persons in the court. Sri Vijaya's queens soon became “good Buddhists”. According to the Culavamsa, “they gave up the false faiths to which they had long been attached and adopted in the best manner possible the true (Buddhist) faith’, worshipping the Tooth Relic day by day with many offerings.

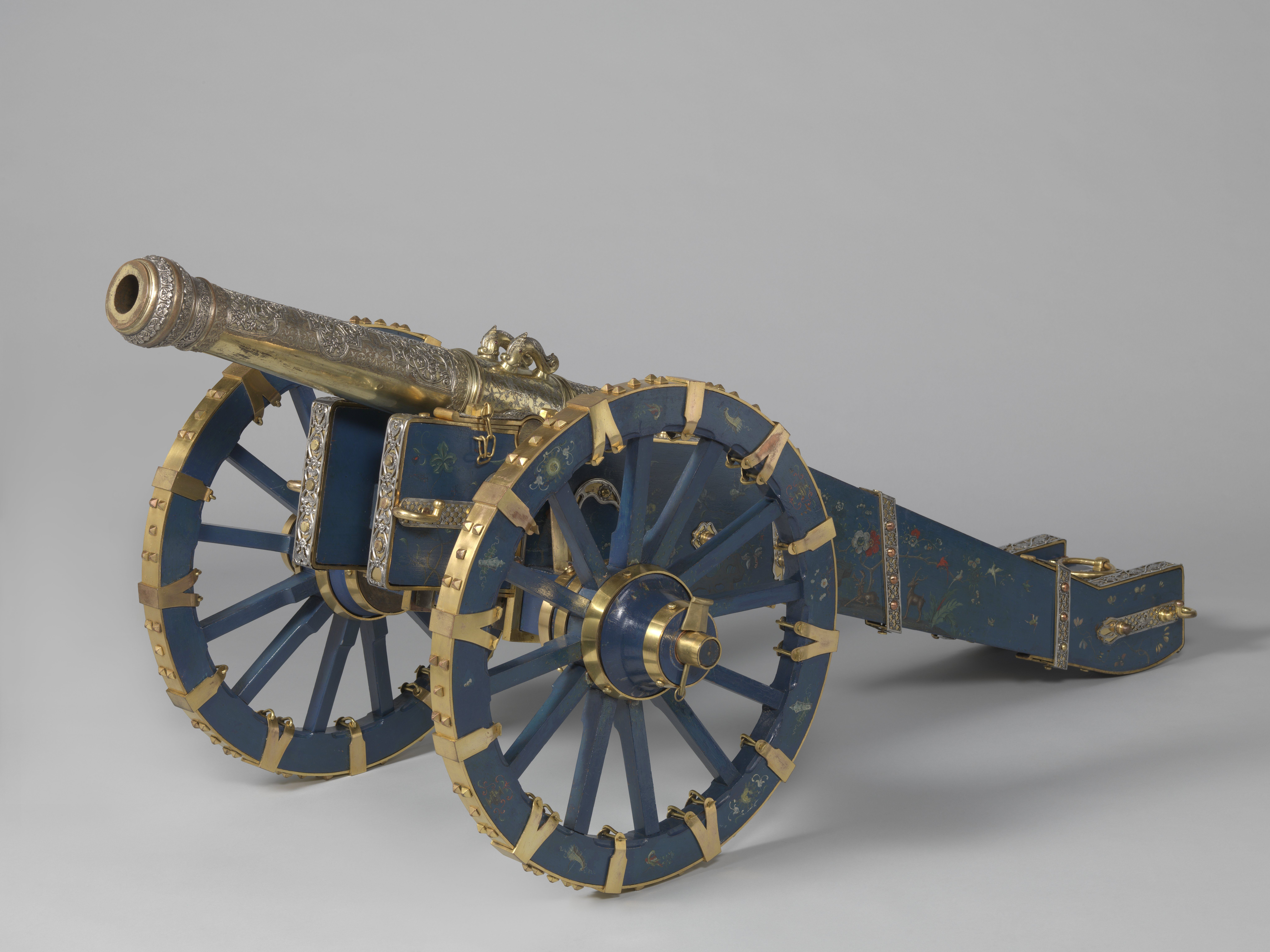
Exquisite Sinhalese bronze cannon with intricate silver and gold inlay, gifted to King Vijaya Rajasingha in 1745 by Lewuke, the Disawa or Lord of the four Korles district.

Sri Vijaya Rajasimha attempted to reintroduce the upasampada ordination that King Narendra Sinha had neglected. While the king’s first attempt was to restore the ordination through Pegu in Burma, failure on this front forced him to contact Ayutthaya in Thailand with Dutch help. Although the death of King Sri Vijaya Rajasinha in 1747 resulted in the cancellation of this endeavor, the dynamic was not broken, and the ordination went ahead in the reign of Kirti Sri Rajasinha (r. 1747-82). On the other hand, and more disturbingly, he persecuted the Catholics. Sri Vijaya's persecution of the Portuguese and other Catholics may have had to do with his growing power and confidence as well as the Dutch factor.

Oratorian priest Jacome Gonsalves tried to influence Sri Vijaya Rajasinha while he was still a "crown prince" (Prince Asthana), presenting him in 1737 a copy of the Budumula (The Root of Buddhism), a refutation of Buddhism. However, Sri Vijaya remained a devout Buddhist under the influence of Saranankara Thero, even as he became the de facto ruler owing to the serious illness of King Naréndrasinha.

In his reign, the ministers fulfilled the requests of the Dutch and acted according to their own desires. As a result, the dissava (Kandyan Chiefs) instructed their provinces where Christians resided to capture the missionaries and bring them to the capital. They were also ordered to confiscate any property belonging to the missionaries and destroy the churches. In one instance, an Adigar gave orders to surround the church of Candia and had Father Mathias Rodrigues captured. Additionally, all church property was confiscated on March 17, 1744.

Sri Vijaya Rajasinghe's reign was complex, marked by his attempts to reintroduce the upasampada ordination while persecuting Catholics. His queens became good Buddhists. His reign also demonstrated the growing power and confidence of the Nayakas in Kandy and their sustained power struggle against established interests.

== See also ==
- Mahavamsa
- List of monarchs of Sri Lanka
- History of Sri Lanka

== Sources ==
- Kings & Rulers of Sri Lanka
- Obeyesekere, Gananath. "Between the Portuguese and the Nāyakas: the many faces of the Kandyan Kingdom, 1591–1765." In Sri Lanka at the Crossroads of History, edited by Zoltán Biedermann, Alan Strathern, and Klemens Karlsson, 161-177. London: UCL Press, 2017. https://www.jstor.org/stable/j.ctt1qnw8bs.13. DOI: https://doi.org/10.2307/j.ctt1qnw8bs.13 This article incorporates text from this source, which is available under the CC BY 4.0 license.

Sri Vijaya Rajasinha Kandy Nayakar Dynasty Born: ? ? Died: 11 August 1747
Regnal titles
Preceded by Vira Narendra Sinha of Sri Lanka	King of Kandy; 13 May 1739 – 11 August 1747	Succeeded by Kirti Sri Rajasinha
