= Japan Theravada Buddhist Association =

Japanese religious organization

- 宗教法人日本テーラワーダ仏教協会
- Predecessor: Japan Theravada Association
- Formation: 1994 (as a religious group); 2003 (as a religious corporation)
- Type: Theravada Buddhist organization
- Members: 1,500 (as of 2008)
- Website: j-theravada.com

The Japan Theravāda Buddhist Association (宗教法人日本テーラワーダ仏教協会, Japan Theravada Buddhist Association) is a Japanese religious organization affiliated with Theravāda Buddhism. It was founded in 1994 by the Sri Lankan monk Alubomulle Sumanasara. He serves as its representative director (kanju, 貫首) and holds the title of Chief Sanghanayaka (senior monastic) of Japan within the Siam Nikaya, in cooperation with Japanese lay Buddhists.
