= Warakagoda (name) =

Warakagoda is a Sinhalese name that may refer to:

Given name

- Warakagoda Sri Gnanarathana Thero (born 1942), Sri Lankan Buddhist monk

Surname

- Deepal Warakagoda (born 1965), Sri Lankan ornithologist
- Wijeratne Warakagoda (born 1933), Sri Lankan actor
