= Galagama Sri Aththadassi Thera =

Most Ven. Galagama Sri Aththadassi Thera
- අතිපූජ්‍ය ගලගම ශ්‍රී අත්ථදස්සී මහනාහිමි
- Title: Mahanayaka of the Asgiriya Chapter of Siyam Nikaya

Personal life
- Born: Kulathunga Mudiyanselage Kiribanda; 11 January 1922 Urulawatta Matale, British Ceylon
- Died: 9 March 2016 (aged 94) Kandy General Hospital, Sri Lanka
- Parent(s): Kulathunga Mudiaynselage Dingiri Banda Nilame (Father); Tennakoon Mudiyanselage Pinchi Amma Kumarihamy (Mother)
- Education: Mathale Daharmaraja Pirivena; Vidyodaya Pirivena

Religious life
- Religion: Buddhism
- School: Theravada
- Lineage: Asgiriya Chapter of Siyam Nikaya
- Dharma name: Most Ven.Galagama Sri Aththadassi Thera

Galagama Sri Aththadassi Thera (11 January 1922 – 9 March 2016) was a Sri Lankan Buddhist monk who served as the 21st Mahanayaka of the Asgiriya Chapter of Siyam Nikaya. He was appointed on 8 May 2015 following the death of Chief Prelate Most Venerable Udugama Sri Buddharakkitha Thera on 8 April 2015.

The Venerable Thera died aged 94 while receiving treatment at the Intensive Care Unit of the Kandy Hospital. He was hospitalized while in an unconscious state after a fall.

== See also ==
- Siyam Nikaya
- Diyawadana Nilame of Sri Dalada Maligawa, Kandy

Buddhist titles
Preceded by Udugama Sri Buddharakkitha Thera	Mahanayaka of the Asgiriya Chapter of Siam Nikaya; 2015 – 2016	Succeeded by Warakagoda Sri Gnanarathana Thera
