= Ridi Viharaya =

2nd-century BCE Theravada Buddhist temple

- රිදී විහාරය
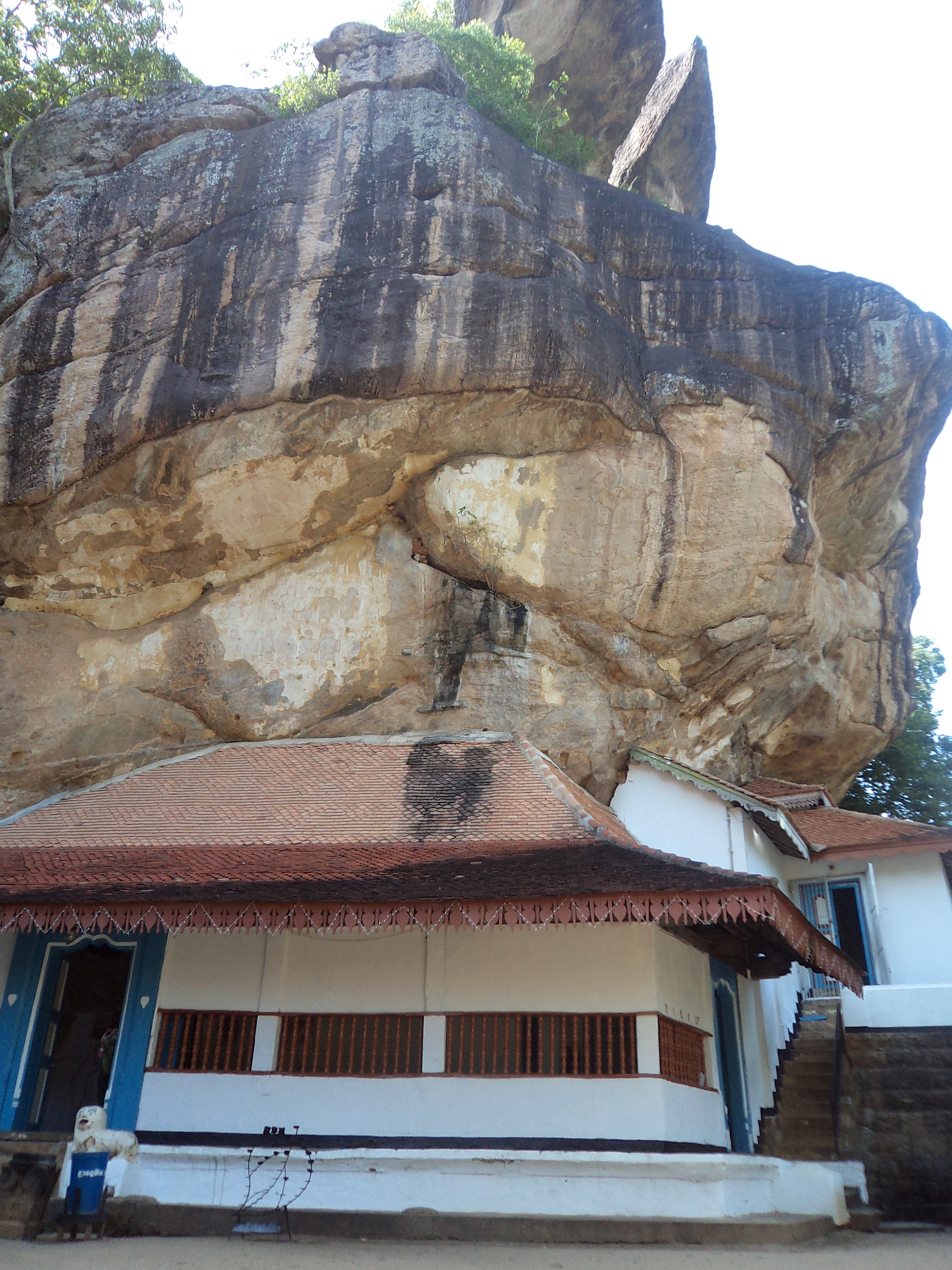
- Maha Viharaya of Ridi Viharaya complex. Rajatha lena can be seen in the background.

Religion
- Affiliation: Buddhism
- District: Kurunegala District
- Province: North Western Province

Location
- Location: Ridigama, Sri Lanka
- Interactive map of Ridi Viharaya
- Coordinates: 07°33′00.0″N 80°29′00.0″E

Architecture
- Type: Buddhist Temple
- Founder: Dutthagamani
- Completed: 2nd-century BCE

Website
- rideeviharaya.lk

Ridi Viharaya (Sinhala: රිදී විහාරය) or Silver Temple is a 2nd-century BCE Theravada Buddhist temple in the village of Ridigama, Sri Lanka. Built during the reign of Dutthagamani of Anuradhapura, the temple is considered as the place where the silver ore, which provided silver to complete Ruwanwelisaya; one of the largest stupas in Sri Lanka, was discovered. According to the chronicles Mahavamsa and Thupavamsa, the Ridi Viharaya complex was built in gratitude for helping him cherish his dream of completing Ruwanwelisaya.

== Location ==
Approximately 18 kilometres northeast of Kurunegala, Ridi Viharaya is located in Ridigama. Kurunegala is located 94 kilometres northeast of Colombo, the capital of Sri Lanka. The temple is approximately 10 kilometres from Ibbagamuwa, in the A6 highway, which connects Kurunegala and Dambulla.

== History ==
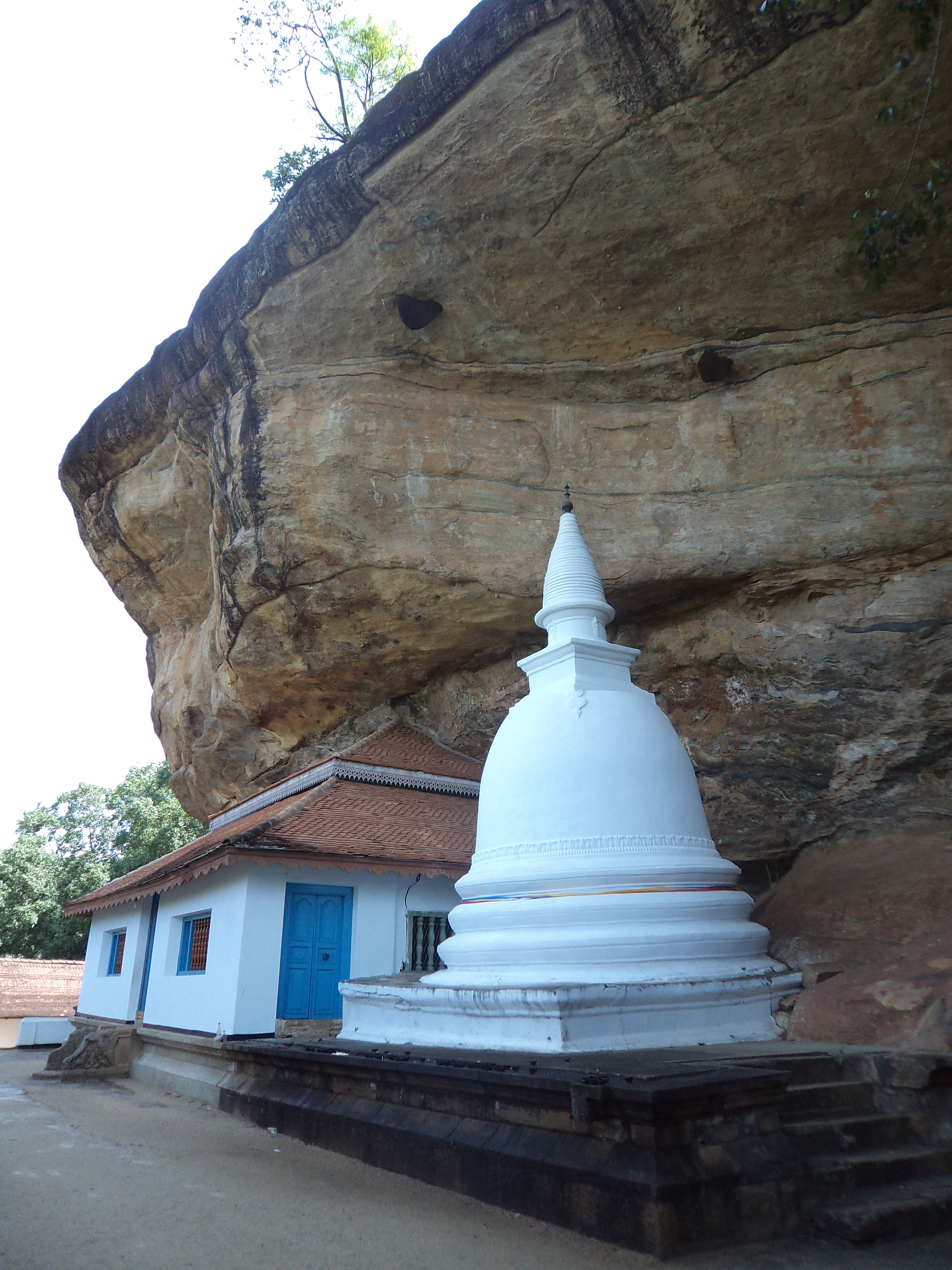
Uda Viharaya and adjacent stupa.

Dutthagamani of Anuradhapura, a Sinhalese king of ancient Sri Lanka, known for his campaign that defeated and overthrew the usurping Tamil prince Ellalan of Chola Kingdom, reigned from 161 BCE to 137 BCE in the Anuradhapura Kingdom. Upon his victory over Elara, he initiated construction of Ruwanwelisaya, also known as the "Great Stupa", one of the tallest monuments built before the 20th century. Among other materials, silver was required for the basement of the stupa.

In the meantime, some merchants were travelling from the central highlands of Sri Lanka, to the then capital of the country; Anuradhapura. According to the chronicles, they saw some ripe jackfruit in the Ridigama area; cut it and thought of offering the first half to Buddhist monks as a ritual. Four Arhat monks appeared according to their wish and accepted the dāna. Then four more monks came and accepted the dāna. The last monk, known as Arhat Indragupta, after partaking the jackfruit, directed the merchants to a path which led to a cave with silver ore. They informed the monarch of their finding after arriving in Anuradhapura. He was much elated upon hearing the news. The ore provided the required amount of silver for the construction work. In gratitude, he built a temple complex on the silver ore, employing 300 masons and 700 others including his chief artisan Vishwakarma Prathiraja.

There are approximately twenty-five caves around the temple, which are considered to be inhabited by Arhat monks, since the arrival of Arahat Mahinda in 3rd century BCE. The temple was revived in the 18th century CE, during the reign of Kirti Sri Rajasinha of Kandy (1746-1778 CE). Uda Viharaya was added to the complex during this period. Several affiliated devalas: Kumara Bandara Devalaya and Paththini Devalaya were also established. Ridi Viharaya now falls under the Malwatte chapter of Buddhist temples in Sri Lanka.

== Associated buildings, structures and locations ==
=== Serasum Gala ===
A rock to the right of the entrance, which is believed to be the place where the initial temple was built. It is also considered that this was the place where king Dutthagamani dressed prior to worshiping at the temple. A small stupa is located on top of this rock.

=== Waraka Welandu Viharaya ===
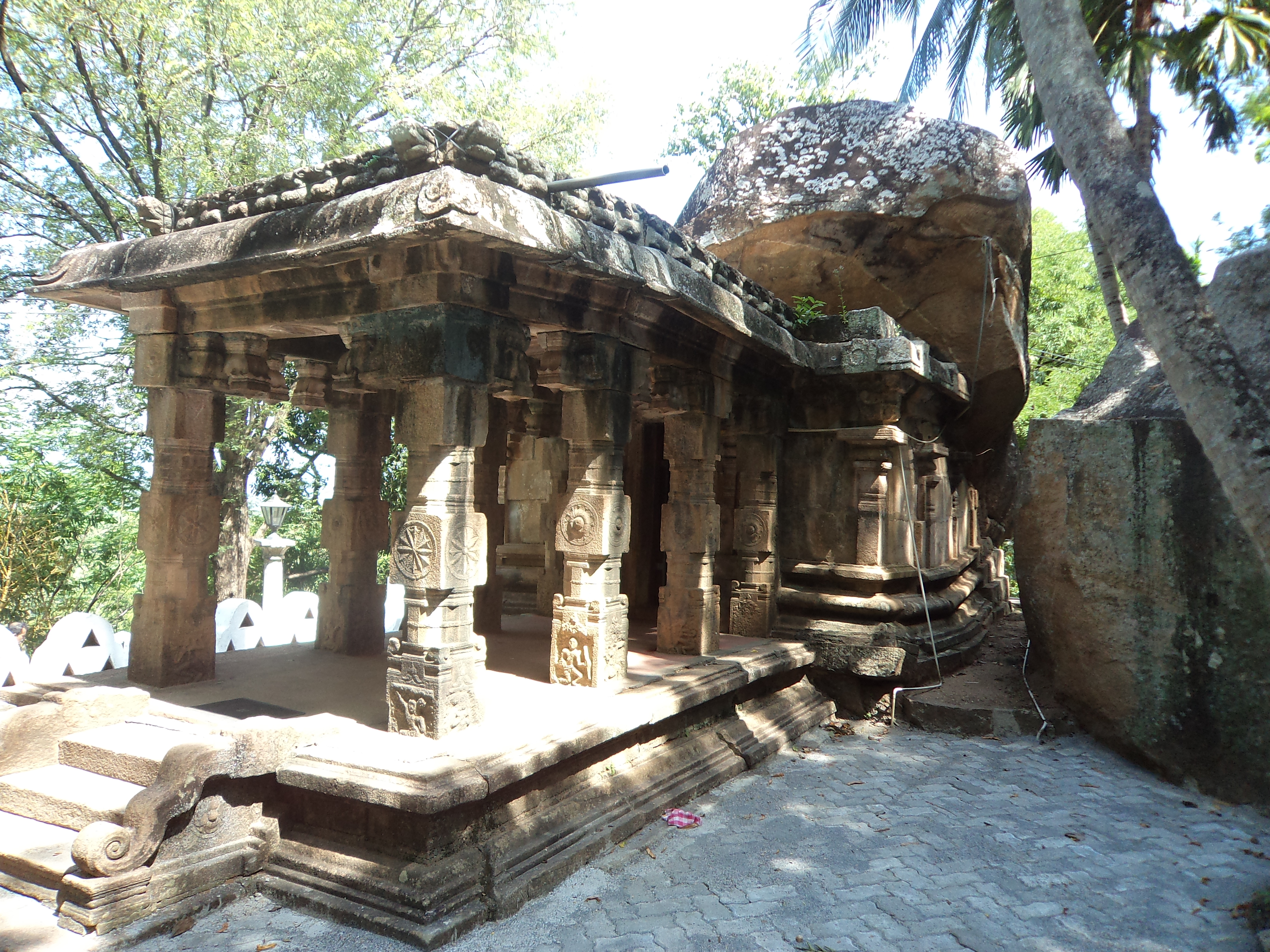
Waraka Welandu Viharaya at Ridi Viharaya.

Waraka Welandu Viharaya is a Polonnaruwa era building, considered as the place where the Arhat monks accepted jackfruit from the merchants. The name "Waraka Welandu Viharaya" (temple which the jackfruit was consumed) implies this notion. This small Gedige-type building of the size of a room, is built in stone and contains a number of Kandyan era paintings. Its stone roof rests on eight stone pillars, which are decorated on all four sides. Hindu influence can be observed in the carvings of female dancers, which are usually not found in Buddhist temples.

=== Hevisi Mandapaya ===
Located in front of the Maha Viharaya, the Hevisi Mandapaya (or the drummers' pavilion) contains a rice bowl and other objects of historical value. A centuries-old Pallakkiya, which was used to carry elderly monks, can also be seen hung on its roof.

=== Maha Viharaya ===
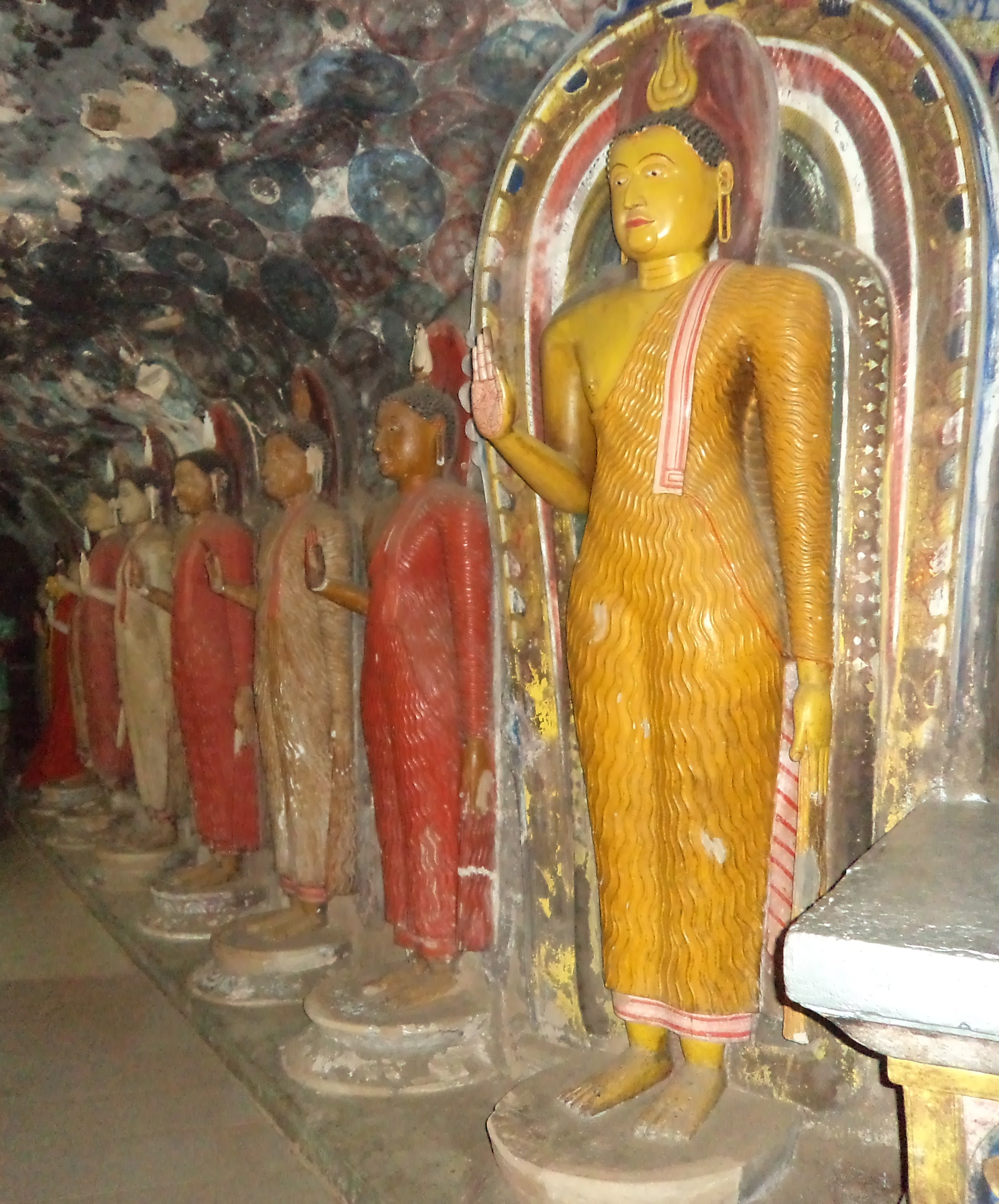
Statues of Gautama Buddha at Maha Viharaya.

Maha Viharaya, or the main temple, is located inside the Rajatha lena (or the silver cave); a massive rock which takes the shape of a cobra head. This cave is considered as the place where the original silver ore was found. Various monarchs, including Amandagamani Abhaya (21-31 CE) and Parakramabahu I of Polonnaruwa (1153-1186 CE) have sponsored the reconstruction and expansion of this temple, which is the oldest of all buildings in the complex.

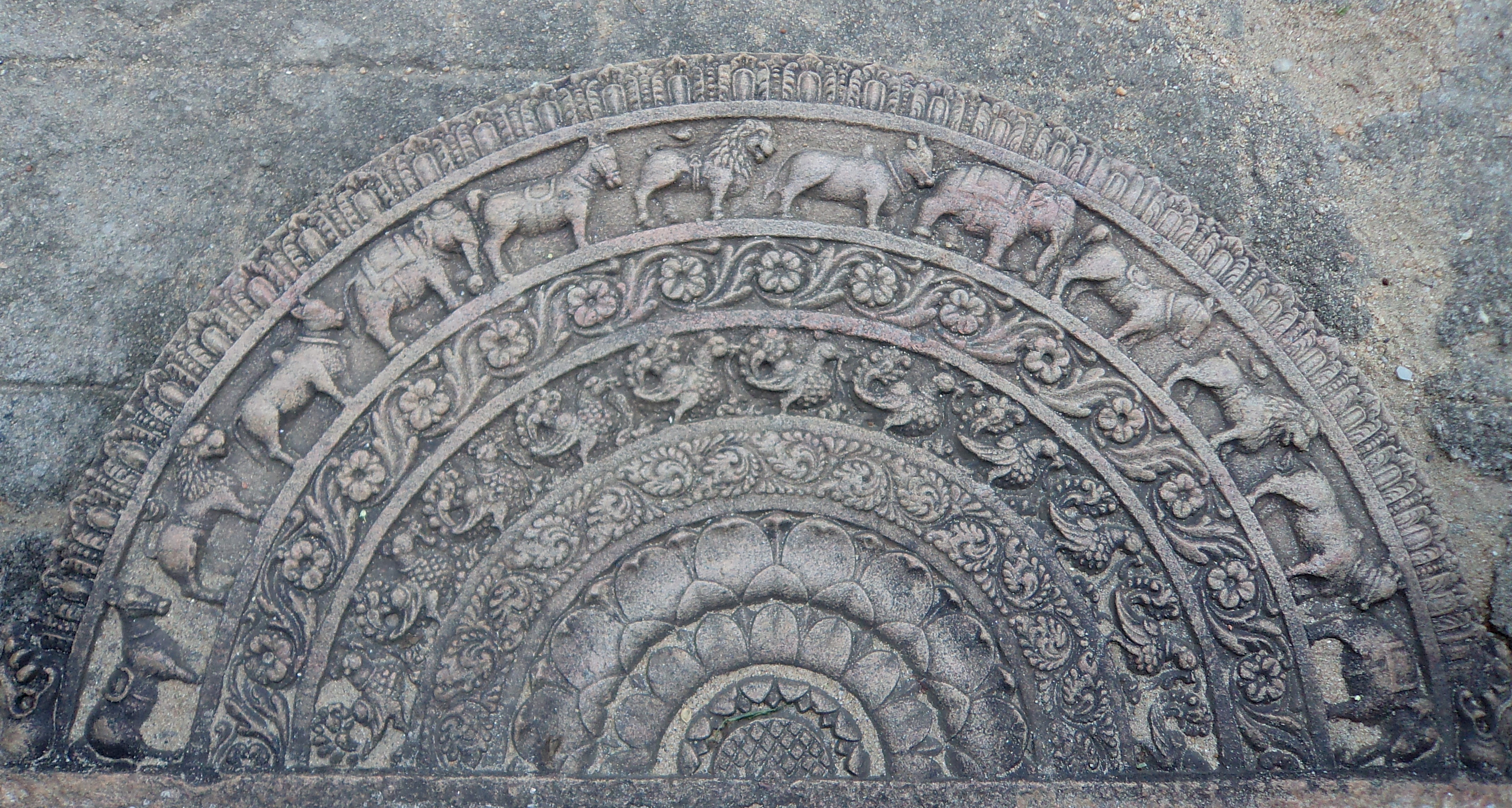
Sandakada pahana, at the entrance of Uda Viharaya.

It contains a number of Buddharupa in various gestures. This include a 9-metre recumbent Buddha statue and an Anuradhapura era-gold plated Buddha statue. According to Ridi vihara asna, a chronicle, the latter was brought down from India. Other statues: including an ancient statue which is believed to be of king Dutthagamani, eight standing Buddha statues, an Avalokiteśvara statue and a reclining Buddha statue donated by Burma can also be seen inside this building. The floor in which recumbent Buddha statue is placed, is decorated with Dutch era porcelain floor tiles: popularly known as "Bible tiles". These blue-and-white tiles portray various biblical figures and stories such as expulsion from the Garden of Eden, dove of peace, prophets of yore, the Last Supper, burning bush and the creation of man. These tiles were gifted to king Kirti Sri Rajasinha by a Dutch envoy. All roofs and walls of Maha Viharaya are decorated with paintings.

=== Uda Viharaya ===
Uda Viharaya, or the upper temple belongs to the Kandyan era, and contains a seated Buddha statue with Makara Thorana and a Sandakada pahana (moonstone). This Sandakada pahana is a unique design, as it takes a semi-circular shape instead of a triangular shape, which is more common in similar designs of Kandy era and the Makara Thorana is the only one of its kind because two dragons appear from either sides of Lord Buddha's shoulders (a thing which cannot be seen in any other Makara Thorana in the world). There are also sculptures of Hindu deities around the main statue. The chamber contains paintings of mythological animals and Ravana: a main character of the legend, the Ramayana. A stupa is located by the right side of this temple. At the entrance, is a Hindu devalaya, which is dedicated to the protector god of the area.

== Paintings and sculpture ==
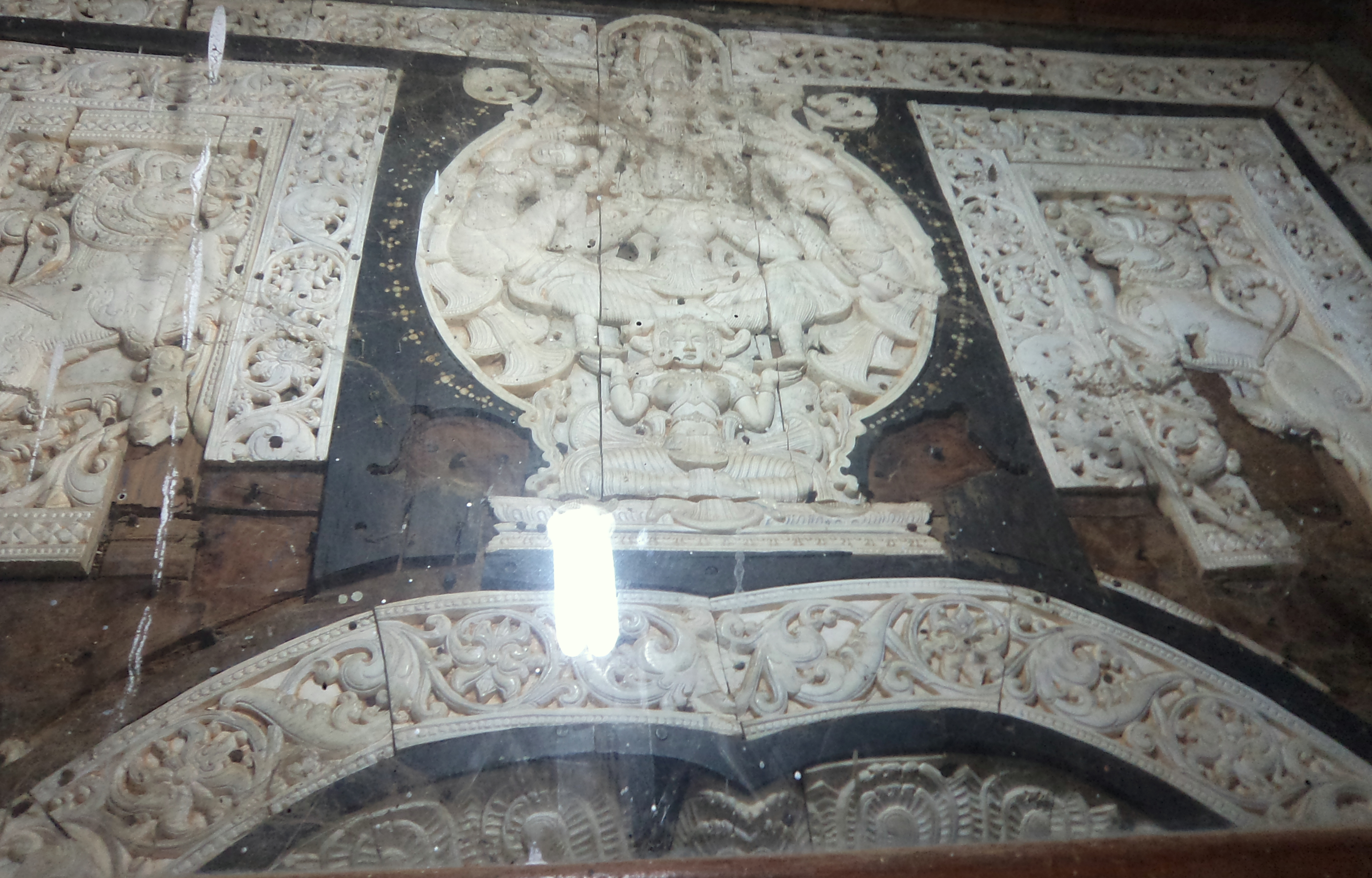
The Pancha Nari Ghataya, carved out of ivory.

The main sculpture here is the Lord Buddha sculpture which was made by pure gold. There are many other sculptures too. There is a shape of an elephant with many drawings of women.

The cave walls of the Rajatha lena are painted with images that relate to incidents of Gautama Buddha's life. Some of these frescos were never completed, but early sketches can still be seen. The cave walls contain small carved out drains known as kataram, to drain rain water away from the paintings.

The Maha Viharaya houses a special kind of sculpture: Pancha Nari Ghataya. It appears as a vase at a distance, but five entwined maiden figures are revealed when observed closely. The sculpture is carved entirely out of ivory. Two lion carvings done in ivory can also be seen on either sides of the main carving.

The roof of the Maha Viharaya is rested on wooden pillars decorated with flower designs. On the sides of the seated Buddha statue at Uda Viharaya, drawings of Sath Sathiya (the way Gautama Buddha spent his first seven weeks after enlightenment) and Kandyan era symbols such as Nawanari Kunjaraya (nine entwined maiden figures in the shape of an elephant), Thri Sinha Rupaya (three seated lion figures with one head), Vrushba Kunjaraya (heads of a bull and an elephant entwined) and Sarpenda can be seen. Initial paintings of Uda Viharaya were done by an acclaimed artist of Kandyan era, Devaragampala Silvath Thena. Rest of the paintings were completed by artists of the Nilagama generation.

== See also ==
- Temple of the Tooth
