= Warakagoda Sri Gnanarathana Thera =

Sri Lankan Buddhist monk (born 1942)

Warakagoda Gnanarathana Thera
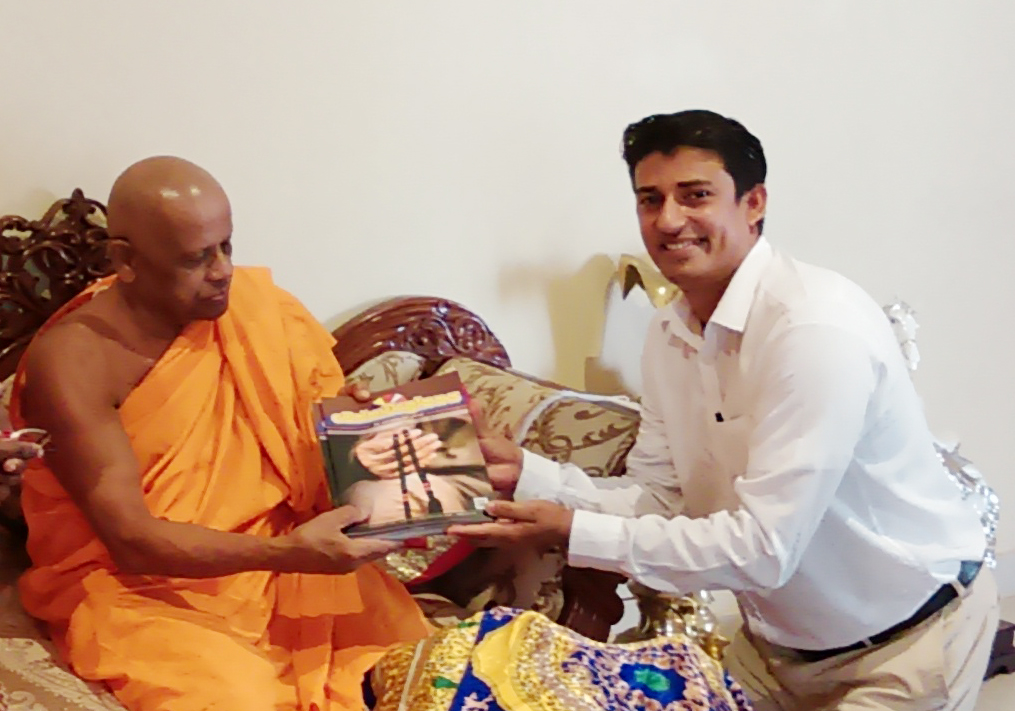
- Warakagoda Sri Gnanarathana Mahanayake Thera presented with a publication.
- Title: Mahanayaka of the Asgiriya Chapter of Siyam Nikaya

Personal life
- Born: 18 March 1942 (age 84)
- Occupation: 22nd Mahanayke Thera of Asgiriya Chapter, The Venerable Chancellor of the Buddhist and Pali University of Sri Lanka

Religious life
- Religion: Buddhism
- School: Theravada
- Lineage: Asgiriya Chapter of Siyam Nikaya

Senior posting
- Based in: Kandy

Warakagoda Gnanarathana Thera (born 18 March 1942) is a Sri Lankan Buddhist monk who is the present Mahanayaka Thera of the Asgiriya Chapter of Siam Nikaya. He was appointed as the 22nd Mahanayake Thera of the Asgiriya Chapter on 7 April 2016, by the Karaka Sangha Sabha of Asgiriya Chapter, after the demise of Galagama Sri Aththadassi Mahanayaka Thera. He is also the Chancellor of the Buddhist and Pali University of Sri Lanka of Sri Lanka.

Gnanarathana Thera is known for voicing his right-wing political proclivities in public. In 2017, he issued a statement condoning the views of the hard-line nationalist monk Galagoda Aththe Gnanasara. At a public event in 2019, Gnanarathana Thera endorsed the views of those who called for the stoning of a Muslim doctor accused of sterilisation of Sinhala women as well as the boycotting of Muslim businesses, stating that Muslims are sterilising Sinhalese through food sold in their shops. At the same event, he endorsed the purported presidential candidacy of Chamal Rajapaksa. The ensuing public backlash forced Gnanarathana Thera to deny his previous statements.

== See also ==
- Siyam Nikaya
- Diyawadana Nilame of Sri Dalada Maligawa, Kandy
- The Venerable Chancellor | Buddhist and Pali University of Sri Lanka, Homagama

Buddhist titles
Preceded by Galagama Sri Aththadassi Thera	Mahanayaka of the Asgiriya chapter of Siam Nikaya; 2016 – present	Succeeded by TBA
