= Malwathu Maha Viharaya =

Buddhist monastery in Sri Lanka

Malwathu Maha Vihara
- මල්වතු මහා විහාරය
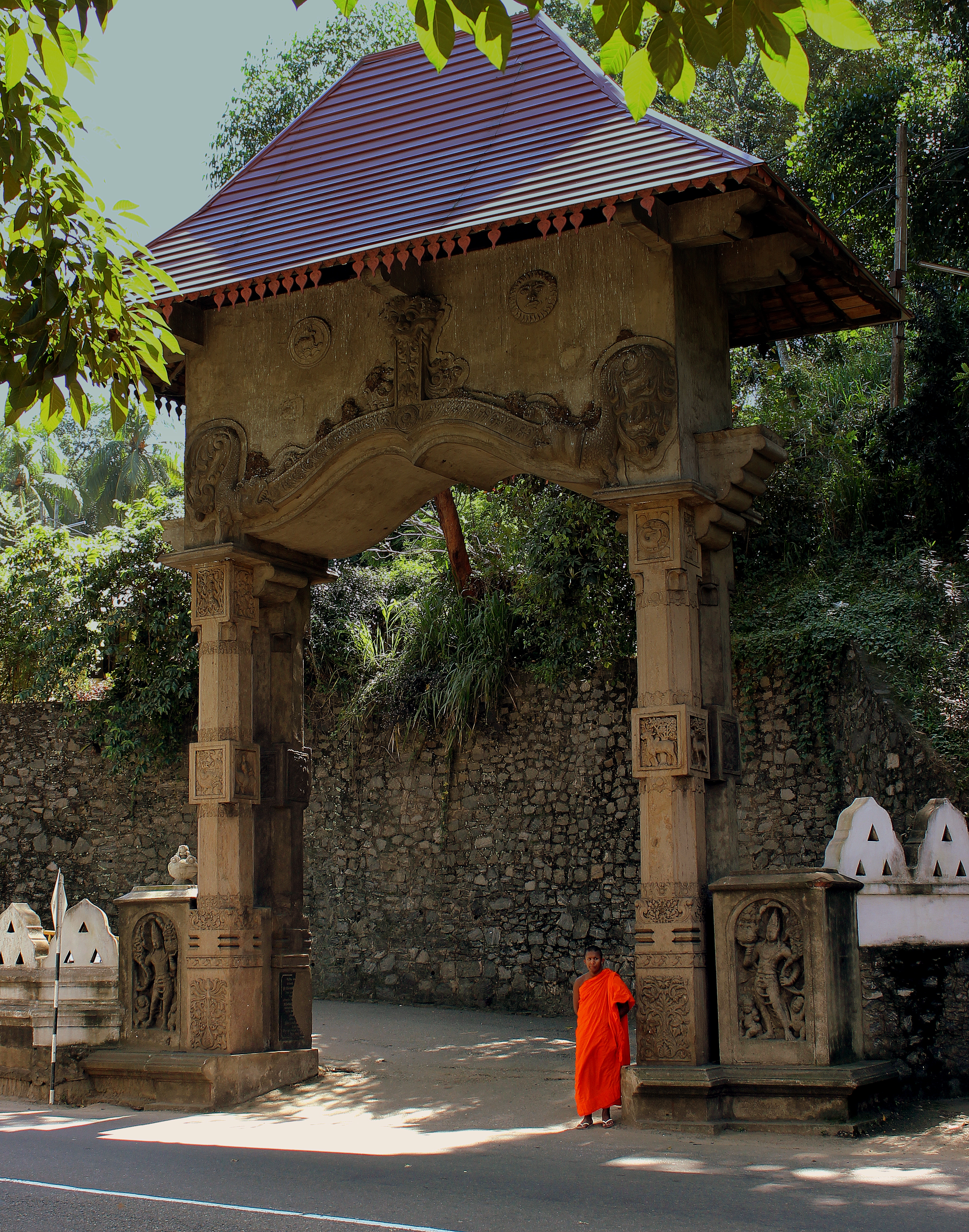
- Entrance to the Malwatu Maha Viharaya

Religion
- Affiliation: Buddhism
- District: Kandy
- Province: Central Province

Location
- Location: Kandy, Sri Lanka
- Interactive map of Malwathu Maha Vihara
- Coordinates: 07°17′23.6″N 80°38′28.9″E

Architecture
- Type: Buddhist Temple
- Founder: Sena Sammatha Wickramabahu (1473–1511)

Malwathu Maha Viharaya (also called Malwatta Temple) is a Buddhist monastery located in Kandy, Sri Lanka. It is the headquarters of the Malwatta Chapter of Siyam Nikaya and one of the two Buddhist monasteries that holds the custodianship of sacred tooth relic of Buddha kept in Sri Dalada Maligawa, Kandy. The Chief Incumbent of the Malwathu Maha Viharaya is the Mahanayaka Thera of Malwatta Chapter of Siyam Nikaya, a leading Buddhist monastic fraternity in Sri Lanka. The present Chief Incumbent of Malwathu Maha Viharaya is Thibbatuwawe Sri Siddhartha Sumangala Thera.

== History ==
This temple is believed to be built by Senasammatha Vikramabahu (1473–1511) along with a stupa and a double storey ordination hall (Uposhathagaraya) in the late 15th century or early 16th century. It was originally built as the residence of three monks but today it houses many Buddhist monks including the monks of Karaka Sangha Sabha (Executive Council) of Malwatta Chapter of Siyam Nikaya. The building known as ‘poya ge’ is used as the assembly hall for the important meetings of the monastic fraternity. This building was built during the reign of King of Kandy Kirti Sri Rajasinha.

== The monastery ==
Malwathu Maha Viharaya consists of two sections, the Uposatha Viharaya which is also known as Poyamalu Viharaya and the other Pushparama Viharaya popularly known as Malwathu Viharaya. Poyamalu Viharaya is the oldest section of the Vihara complex which is today recognised as an archaeologically protected monument.

== Chief Incumbents ==
The following is a list of Chief Incumbents of Malwathu Maha Viharaya, Kandy who are also the Mahanayaka Theras of Malwatta Chapter of Siyam Nikaya. Appointment of senior Buddhist monks to the Mahanayaka position in Sri Lanka began with the re-establishment of Upasampada in 1753 on the initiatives taken by Sangharaja Weliwita Sri Saranankara Thera during the reign of King of Kandy Kirti Sri Rajasinha.

=== List of Chief Incumbents ===
Name	Period
Tibbatuwawe Sri Siddhartha Buddharakkitha Thera තිබ්බටුවාවේ ශ්‍රී සිද්ධාර්ථ බුද්ධරක්ඛිත ථෙර	1753–1773
Medawala Sri Rathanajothi Thera මැදවල ශ්‍රී රතනජෝති ථෙර	1773–1774
Daramitipola Sri Dhammarakkitha Thera දරමිටිපොල ශ්‍රී ධම්මරක්ඛිත ථෙර	1774–1787
Morathota Rajaguru Sri Dhammakkhanda Thera මොරතොට රාජගුරු ශ්‍රී ධම්මක්ඛන්ධ මහා ථෙර	1787–1811
Kobekaduwe Rajaguru Siriniwasa Thera කොබ්බෑකඩුවේ රාජගුරු සිරිනිවාස මහා ථෙර	1811–1819
Welivita Sri Saranakara Thera වැලිවිට ශ්‍රී සරණංකර මහා ථෙර	1819–1822
Gammulle Sri Sumana Thera ගම්මුල්ලේ ශ්‍රී සුමන මහා ථෙර	1822–1825
Kotikapola Sri Rathanajothi Thera කොටිකාපොල ශ්‍රී රතනජෝති මහා ථෙර	1825–1826
Kandegedara Sri Rewatha Thera කන්දෙගෙදර ශ්‍රී රේවත මහා ථෙර	1826–1829
Galgiriyawe Sri Sumangala Thera ගල්ගිරියාවේ ශ්‍රී සුමංගල මහා ථෙර	1829–1850
Parakumbure Sri Vipassi Thera පරකුබුරේ ශ්‍රී විපස්සි මහා ථෙර	1850–1862
Medagama Sri Dewamitta Thera මැදගම ශ්‍රී දේවමිත්ත මහා ථෙර	1862–1877
Hippola Sri Sobhitha Thera හිප්පොල ශ්‍රී සෝභිත මහා ථෙර	1877–1893
Thibbatuwawe Sri Sumangala Thera තිබ්බටුවාවේ ශ්‍රී සුමංගල මහා ථෙර	1893–1913
Galgiriyawe Sri Buddharakkitha Thera ගල්ගිරියාවේ ශ්‍රී බුද්ධරක්ඛිත මහා ථෙර	1913–1919
Amunugama Sri Piyadassi Thera අමුණුගම ශ්‍රී පියදස්සි මහා ථෙර	1919–1924
Abanwelle Sri Sumangala Thera අඹන්වැල්ලේ ශ්‍රී සුමංගල මහා ථෙර	1924–1927
Pahamune Sri Sumangala Thera පහමුණේ ශ්‍රී සුමංගල මහා ථෙර	1927–1945
Rambukwelle Sri Sobhitha Thera රඹුක්වැල්ලේ ශ්‍රී සෝභිත මහා ථෙර	1946–1955
Welivita Sri Saranankara Thera වැලිවිට ශ්‍රී සරණංකර මහා ථෙර	1955–1956
Purijjala Sri Saranankara Thera පුරිජ්ජල ශ්‍රී සරණංකර මහා ථෙර	1956–1963
Amunugama Sri Wipassi Thera අමුණුගම ශ්‍රී විපස්සි මහා ථෙර	1964–1969
Madugalle Sri Dhamma Siddhi Thera මඩුගල්ලේ ශ්‍රී ධම්මසිද්ධි මහා ථෙර	1969–1973
Sirimalwatte Sri Ananda Thera සිරිමල්වත්තේ ශ්‍රී ආනන්ද මහා ථෙර	1973–1989
Rambukwelle Sri Vipassi Thera රබුක්වැල්ලේ ශ්‍රී විපස්සි මහා ථෙර	1989–2004
Thibbatuwawe Sri Siddhartha Sumangala Thera තිබ්බටුවාවේ ශ්‍රී සිද්ධාර්ථ සුමංගල මහා ථෙර	2004–present

== See also ==
- Asgiri Maha Viharaya
