= Weliwita Sri Saranankara Thera =

Buddhist monk and the last Sangharaja of Sri Lanka (1698–1778)

Welivita Sri Saranakara Thera
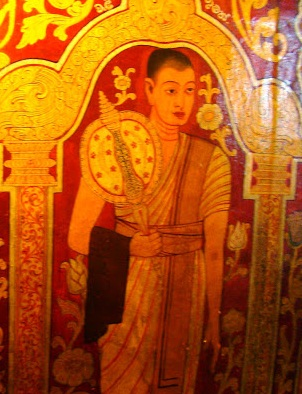
- A wall painting of Weliwita Sri Saranankara Sangharaja Thera
- Title: Sangharaja

Personal life
- Born: Kulathun Bandara (කුලතුං බණ්ඩාර); 19 June 1698 Welivita Waththe Walauwa, Tumpane, Kandy District
- Died: 18 July 1778 (aged 80) Malwathu Maha Viharaya, Kandy
- Occupation: Sangharaja, the Supreme Patriarch of Sri Lanka

Religious life
- Religion: Buddhism
- School: Theravada
- Lineage: Siyam Nikaya
- Dharma name: Welivita Pindapathika Asarana Sarana Sri Saranakara Sangharaja Thera

Senior posting
- Teacher: Suriyagoda Maha Thera
- Students: Thibbotuwawe Buddharakkitha Thera, Daramitipola Dhammarakkhitha Thera, Rambukwelle Dhammarakkhitha Thera, Wehelle Dhammadinna Thera, Morathota Dhammakkhanda Thera, Welivita Saranankara Thera II

Weliwita Asaranasarana Sri Saranankara Sangharaja Thera (19 June 1698 – 18 July 1778) or popularly Weliwita Sri Saranankara Thera was a Buddhist monk, who was the last Sangharaja of Sri Lanka. He was the pioneer in the revival of Buddhism in Sri Lanka, after the decline of the religion in the 17th and 18th centuries. Saranankara Thera was bestowed with the a title by king Kirthi Sri Rajasinghe in 1753, the same year he received the Upasampada (higher ordination of Buddhist monks) and re-established the Upasampada in Sri Lanka with the help of Mahasangha in Siam. He is also credited with the establishment of Silvath Samagama (pious group), a union of monks who lived in accordance with the Buddhist monastic discipline.

== Early years ==
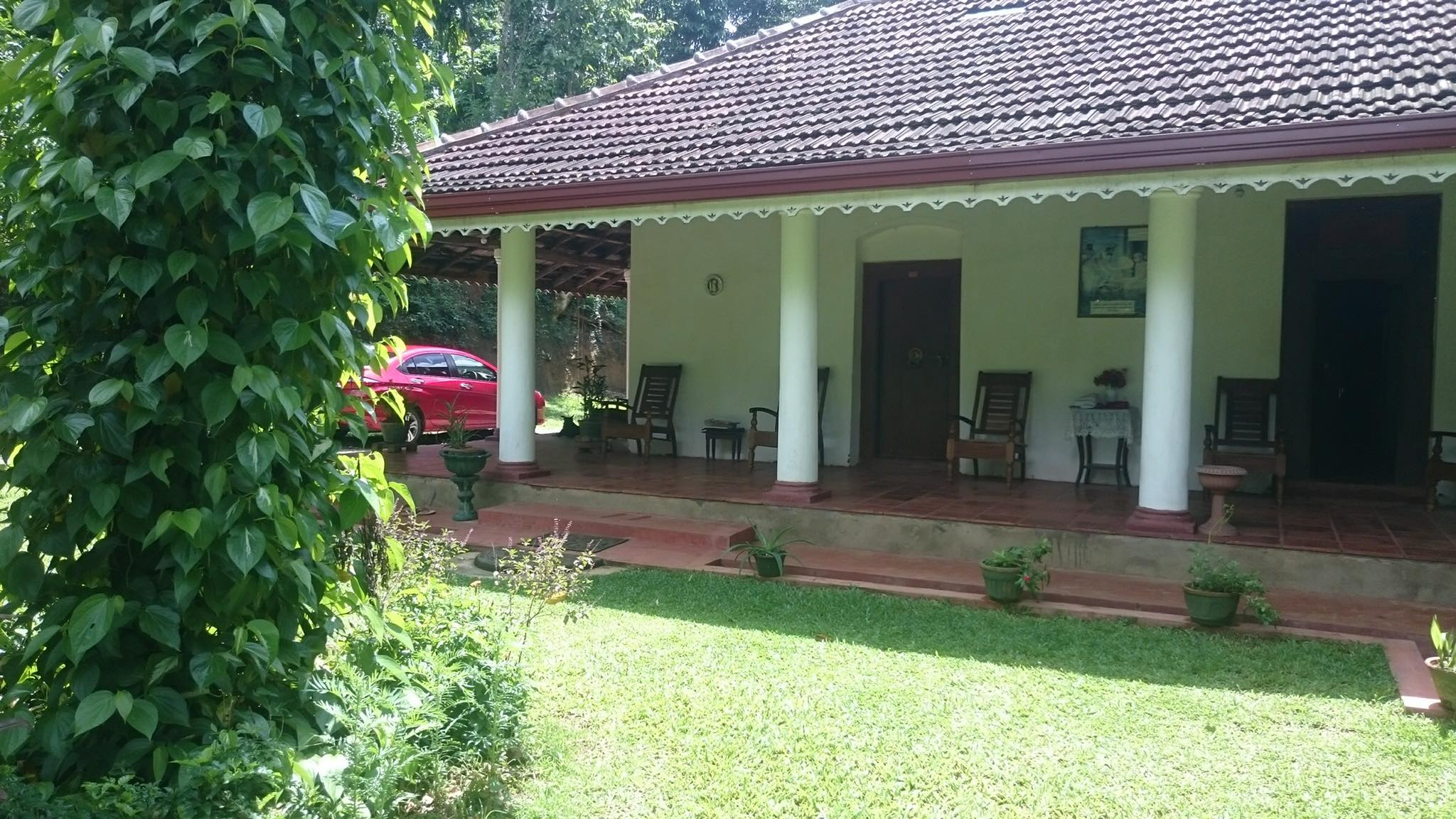
Welivita Sri Saranakara Thera was born on 19 June 1698 in Welivita Waththe Walauwa, Tumpane, Hatharaliyadda, about 24 km from Kandy.

Welivita Sri Saranakara Thera was born on 19 June 1698, in Welivita Waththe Walauwa, Tumpane, Hatharaliyadda, about 24 km from Kandy. His father was a chieftain and was a descendant of an influential family. At the age of 16, he was ordained as a samanera at the sooriyagoda temple in kandy, by the name Weliwita saranankara. Weliwita Sri Saranankara Samanera received the 'upasampada' and qualified as a higher ordained monk on the Esala poya day in 1753 at the Malwatu Maha Viharaya. King Kirti Sri Rajasinha and his ministers proceeded to Malwatta Viharaya and presented Weliwita Sri Saranankara thera with the insignia of the office of Sangharaja in a grand assembly of Buddhist monks. Welivita Sri Saranankara Thera was the last Sri Lankan monk to hold the prestigious Sangharaja title, which is the highest office conferred on a monk in a Theravada Buddhist country His lay name was Kulathun Bandara and his brother. This family had held administrative positions in the Uva Dissavaniya for centuries according to books such as Sangarajawatha, Sangha Raja Saduchariyawa and other sources found in the Poth Gula of the Temple of the Sacred Tooth Relic, Kandy. Though his parents initially opposed his idea to enter the Buddhist monastic order, later he was granted permission by parents and was ordained as a Samanera at the age of 16 under the scholar monk.

His teacher, Suriyagoda Rajaguru thera, who had received upasampada ordination from the Arakanese monks (Burmese) in 1679, exercised considerable influence within the Kandyan Kingdom and had the patronage of King Vira Narendrasinghe (1707–39). He was the last Sinhala king, after whom Nayakkar dynasty succeeded to the throne of Kandyan Kingdom. In 1715, Suriyagoda thera was charged with treason by the king and executed. Thus young Saranankara Samanera left on his own, took up residence in the mountainous region of Alagalla (Kadugannwa) a few miles away from Kandy and devoted his early years to learning Pali language. Saranakara Samanera lived in a cave at Alagalla and the villagers provided him with alms food.

During that time, almost all the Buddhist clergy were known as Ganinnanses or as Samaneras, as there was no way of them receiving the upasampada, to qualify as a fully ordained Bhikku. Higher ordination Upasampada became defunct in the era as a result of the decline of Buddhism due to colonial invasion of the maritime provinces of Sri Lanka. Education of the novice monks has been neglected as there was no one capable to teach the basic components of Pali grammar. Welivita Saranakara Samanera was able to learn the principles of Pali grammar from Levuke Ralahamy, who had studied it from Watabuluwe Thera. His tutor Leuke Ralahamy was a one, who had been imprisoned by the king in a village close to Alagalla, where Saranankara samanera resided after the execution of his teacher Suriyagoda thera.

With great effort and devotion he expanded his knowledge in Pali language and Buddhist doctrine, for which purpose he traveled from place to place in search of books and tutors. Later he went about preaching Buddha Dhamma to encourage others to rise up for the welfare of the religion. This behavior of Weliwita Saranankara Samanera made him popular as a teacher as well as a preacher. In addition to his skill as a scholar he was also known for his austere practices, kindness, purity of thought and attachment to religious life, which were rare qualities. His habit to help the poor earned him the epithet Asarana Sarana, the one who helps the helpless.

Although the Buddhist clergy known as Ganninnanse were living like laymen and forgotten their sacred calling, they were getting their alms to the temples regularly. The young Saranankara Samanera, as an objection against the manner in which Ganinnanses' lived in that era, refused to accept the food that brought to the temples, and led an exemplary life of real priesthood. He depended for his sustenance on the ancient practice of Buddhist monks known as Pindapata, gathering ones food from house to house in his alms-bowl. Because of this practice, he earned the epithet Pindapathika Saranankara.

During this period few like-minded companions and followers began to gather around Weliwita Sri Saranankara Samanera. The earliest and most intimate of them were Sitinamaluwe Dhammajothi, Ilipangamuwe and Kadiragoda, who came from the south of the island. They formed themselves into a small fraternity called Silvat Samagama and its members were called silvat tenas (pious ones) distinguishing themselves from other samaneras and ganinnanses. Weliwita Saranankara Samanera's lifelong ambition was to re-establish upasampada ordination in the island.

== Revival of upasampada ==
The behaviour of the Buddhist monks in the early 18th century in Sri Lanka was deeply deteriorated and did not conform to the 'vinaya', monastic discipline accepted for the bhikkus. Most of them had close association with women and some had children by them. In view of their immoral behaviour, they did not receive either the reverence or the honour of the laity, who ignominiously called them 'ganai' or 'ganaya', who differed from the laity only by their yellow robe. At that point of time there were no erudite monks to deliver discourses to the laity and it was very difficult to find five higher ordained Buddhist monks to offer a 'sanghika-dana' (alms giving) in the entire country. Ganninnanse only read the Jataka-potha (book on the previous lives of the Buddha), to the laymen who assembled to hear the discourses on Dhamma.

The main reason for the decline of Buddhism during this period was mainly due to the infiltration of Catholicism, which spread because of the tolerance of the kings, who gave a free hand to the missionaries to spread their faith. This decline further increased with the division of the Buddhist monks into two groups as 'Silvats' and 'Ganinnanses'. The Portuguese and Dutch influence in the Kandyan Kingdom over the Sinhalese were such that the Sinhalese began to assimilate foreign customs, ways of life, dress and language resulting in transformation of their local life style. It was inevitable that these foreign customs seeped into the Buddhist monks as well.

During this period Weliwita Sri Saranankara Samanera, who led the Silvat monks (monks who behaved according to the monastic discipline) was entrusted with the task of tutoring prince Vijaya Rajasinghe, young brother-in-law of King Vira Narendrasinghe. Since the king had no children from his main consort, the young brother-in-law of the king was the next in line for the throne of Kandyan Kingdom. With the appointment of Vijaya Rajasinghe to the throne in 1739, Welivita Sri Saranankara had the opportunity to make a direct influence to the king. He managed to persuade the king by 1741 to negotiate with the Dutch, who were ruling maritime provinces to accommodate a delegation to Siam (now Thailand), to revive the higher ordination, Upasampada. The king got the assistance of the Dutch to send a delegation to Siam, which was unsuccessful. Several members of the delegation died when the ship they traveled sank on the way while the survivors returned to Sri Lanka. A second delegation which was dispatched in 1745, led by one of the survivors of the first delegation successfully reached Siam, but could not conclude the negotiations due to the untimely death of the king Vijaya Rajasinghe. The King of Siam was reluctant to send Siamese monks to revive the monastic lineage of Sri Lanka without knowing what the attitude of the new king would be in this matter.

After the demise of King Vijaya Rajasinghe in 1747, Kirti Sri Rajasinha was appointed as the King of Kandyan Kingdom. The reign of king Kirti Sri Rajasinha brought a new energy to the revival of Buddhism in Sri Lanka. Weliwita Sri Saranankara Samanera extended his fullest corporation to the new king who depended on him for advice, guidance and inspiration. He urged the king to send a third embassy to Siam with the help of Dutch East India Company for the revival of Upasampada. The third delegation which left Kandy in July 1751 made it to Trincomalee and left Sri Lanka's shores later in the same month. The mission was successful and the new King of Siam, Borommakot, accepted the request of king Kirti Sri Rajasinha and sent a delegation of twenty, headed by Upali Maha Thera to Sri Lanka. Two years later the delegation with Upali Thera was able to set sail back to Sri Lanka and reached Trincomalee in May 1753 after leaving Siam in January 1753. The delegation which was headed by Upali Thera, composed of higher ordained Siamese monks, who entered Kandy in June 1753.

== Appointed Sangaraja ==
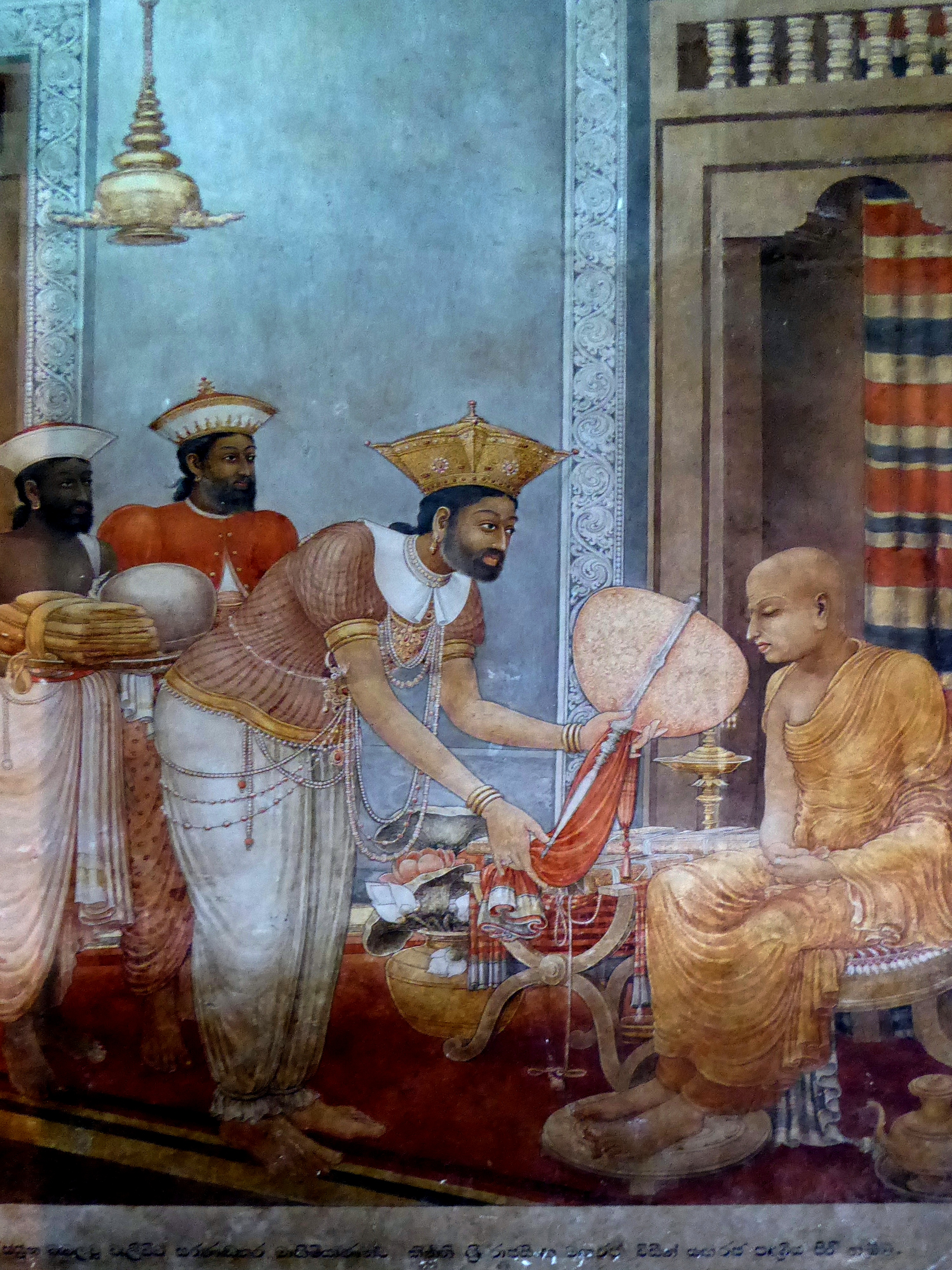
King Kirti Sri Rajasinha appointed Weliwita Sri Saranankara Thera as the Sangharaja of Sri Lanka.

At the age of 55, Weliwita Sri Saranankara Samanera received the 'upasampada' and qualified as a higher ordained monk on the Esala poya day in 1753 at the Malwatu Maha Viharaya. King Kirti Sri Rajasinha and his ministers proceeded to Malwatta Viharaya and presented Weliwita Sri Saranankara thera with the insignia of the office of Sangharaja in a grand assembly of Buddhist monks. Welivita Sri Saranankara Thera was the last Sri Lankan monk to hold the prestigious Sangharaja title, which is the highest office conferred on a monk in a Theravada Buddhist country.

After becoming the Sangharaja, he was involved extensively with activities to revive the Buddha Sasana by assisting the monks, in particular the samanera or novice monks to pursue their learning and service to the nation. He was not interested in material possessions such as land, buildings and property in general. His interest was focused on the development and the welfare of the monks that he led in Sri Lanka. He traveled extensively in the country, especially in the south to organise and restore the former prestige of the Buddhism and Buddhist monks in Sri Lanka.

After rendering a great service to the Buddha Sasana by re-establishing the higher ordination ritual of Upasampadha in the country, Weliwita Sri Saranankara Mahathera died at the age of 80 on the full moon poya day in July 1778. He died at the forest hermitage near Hantana, while observing 'vas' (retreat). It was his favourite forest abode, which is situated a few miles from Kandy. He was listening to the Satipatthana Sutta with right mindfulness, recited by Malinbada Gunarathana Thera at the time of his death.

== Literary works ==
The activities of Weliwita Sri Saranankara Thera led to the re-establishment of Upasampada (higher ordination) and restored the purity of the Buddhism in the country. In addition to that his leadership and influence also brought a literary revival as a result of the impetus given by him to the education of Pali language and Buddha's teachings. Welivita Sri Saranankara thera compiled many important religious literary works and several other pupils of Weliwita Sri Saranankara thera also composed many literary works.

The books such as the Munigunalankara, a Sinhalese poem in praise of Buddha, the Sarartha Sangraha, a treatise on various doctrinal teachings of Buddhist philosophy and Abhisambodhialankara, a Pali poem on the life of Bodhisattva from the times of Dipankara Buddha up to his enlightenment are some examples for his religious literary work. The Madhurartha Prakasini, which is a Sinhalese commentarial paraphrase to the Pali Mahabodhivamsa and the Rupamala, a work on Pali grammar are also his literary creations.
