= Siam Nikaya =

Sri Lankan Buddhist monastic order, originated from Thailand

- සියම් මහ නිකාය
- Named after: the Kingdom of Siam
- Formation: 20 July 1753; 273 years ago
- Founder: Upali Thera
- Type: Monastic order
- Headquarters: Malwathu Maha Viharaya; Asgiri Maha Viharaya
- Origins: Maha Nikaya (Thailand)
- Region served: Sri Lanka
- Members: 18,780
- Mahanayaka Thera of the Malwatta Chapter: Thibbatuwawe Sri Siddhartha Sumangala Thera (Since 20 June 2004)
- Mahanayaka Thera of the Asgiriya Chapter: Warakagoda Sri Gnanarathana Thera (Since 7 April 2016)
- Key people: Kandyan king Kirti Sri Rajasinha; Siamese king Borommakot; Weliwita Sri Saranankara Thera

The Siam Nikaya is a monastic order within Sri Lankan Buddhism, founded by Upali Thera of Siam, on the initiatives taken by Weliwita Sri Saranankara Thera to revive Buddhism in Sri Lanka in the mid-18th century. At the beginning it was located predominantly around the city of Kandy but now has spread to the other parts of the country as well. It is named as 'Siam' because it was originated within Thailand (formerly known in Sri Lanka as "Siam Deshaya" and Europe as the "Kingdom of Siam"). The Siam Nikaya has two major divisions (Malwatta and Asgiriya) and five other divisions within these two major units. The Malwatta and Asgiriya chapters have two separate Maha Nayaka Theras or Chief Monks.

== Background ==
By the mid-18th century, upasampada (higher ordination, as distinct from samanera or novice ordination) had become extinct in Sri Lanka again. The Buddhist order had become extinct thrice during the preceding five hundred years and was re-established in the reigns of Vimaladharmasuriya I (1591–1604) and Vimaladharmasuriya II (1687–1707) as well. These re-establishments were short lived. On the initiative of Weliwita Sri Saranankara Thera (1698–1778) the Thai monk Upali Thera visited the Kingdom of Kandy in 1753 during the reign of Kirti Sri Rajasinha of Kandy (1747–1782), and there performed upasampada for a group of Kandyans.

Although hagiographies written within Sri Lanka avoid the issue, the foundation of the Siam Nikaya was closely linked to both the aristocratic and caste politics of its era, including an attempted coup d'état that is unusually well-documented, due to the interaction of the colonial Dutch and the king of Kandy at the time:

[T]he plot of 1760... occurred during the reign of Kirti Sri Rajasimha and shortly after the formal beginnings of the Siam Nikaya in 1753. One group within the local aristocracy conspired to overthrow the king and place a Siamese prince on the throne. The leaders are said to have included not only key lay administrators... but also some of the leading Siam Nikaya monks. Valivita Saranamkara, founder of the Siam Nikaya, and his chief student... were named among the conspirators. The plot was discovered, the Siamese prince was deported (with the reluctant assistance of the Dutch), and the lay administrators were executed.

Upali Thera believed the Buddhist Sangha in Kandy was suffering from a state of corruption, which included the practice of astrology and his efforts were aimed at "purifying" the practices of the monastic order. It was also through the efforts of Upali Thera that the Kandy Esala Perahera was reorganised in its present form. Annually in Kandy, there is a celebration which includes a parade in which the focus is the relic of the tooth of the Buddha. This procession was originally focused on honour to Hindu deities, particularly those incorporated into Sri Lankan Buddhism. Upali Thera believed this to be inappropriate in a Buddhist nation, and his influence led to the king declaring that "Henceforth Gods and men are to follow the Buddha."

== History ==
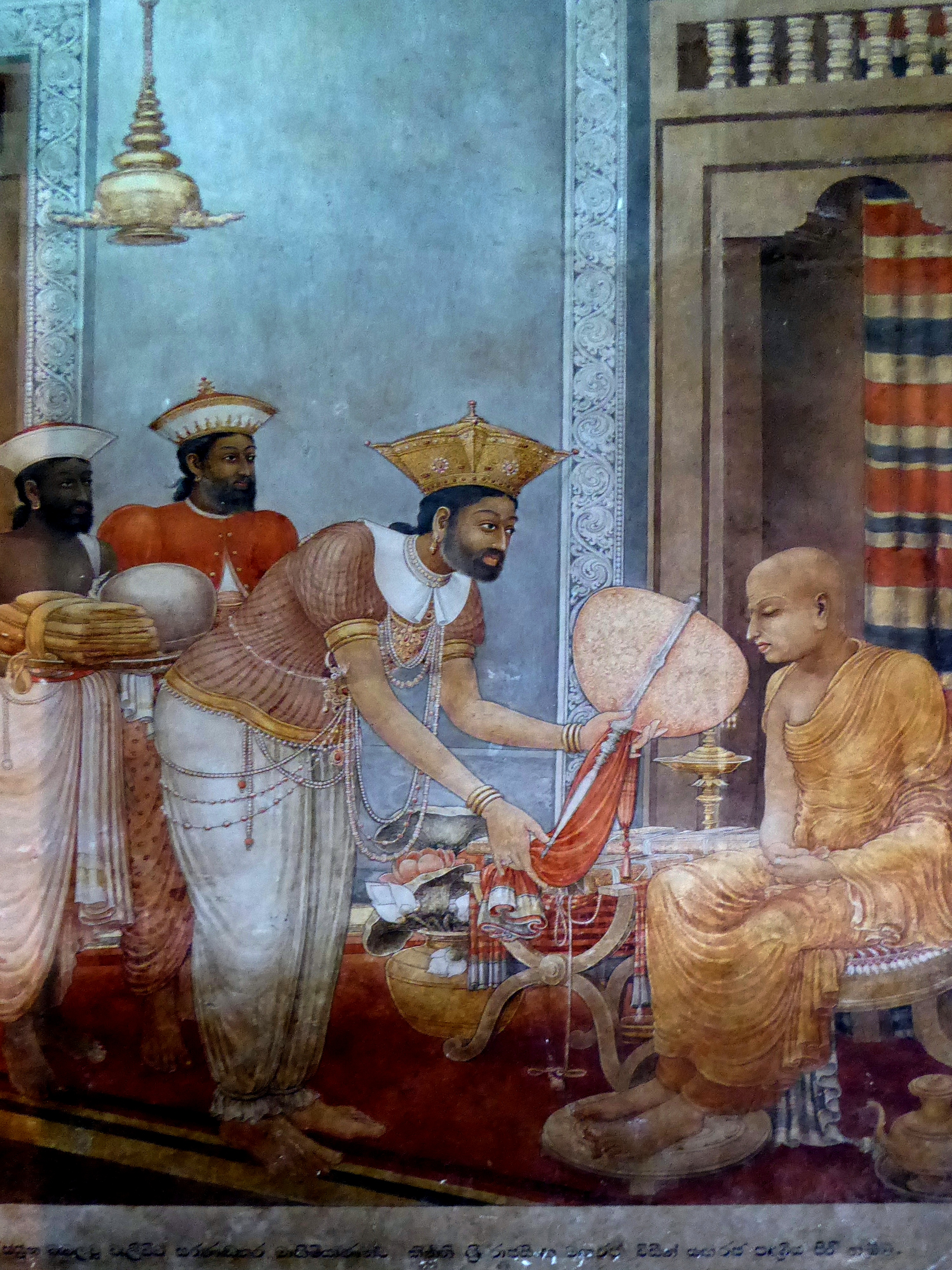
King Kirti Sri Rajasinha appointed Weliwita Sri Saranankara Thera as the Sangharaja of Sri Lanka after reestablishing Upasampada.

However, in 1764, merely a decade after the re-establishment of the Buddhist order in Sri Lanka by reverend Upali, a group within the newly created Siam Nikaya conspired and succeeded in restricting the Nikaya's higher ordination only to the Radala and Govigama caste, Sitinamaluwe Dhammajoti (Durawa) being the last non-Govigama monk receive his upasampada. This was a period when Buddhist Vinaya rules had been virtually abandoned and some members of the Buddhist Sangha in the Kandyan Kingdom privately held land, had wives and children, resided in private homes and were called Ganinnanses. It was a period when the traditional nobility of the Kandyan Kingdom was decimated by continuous wars with the Dutch rulers of the Maritime Provinces. In the maritime provinces, too a new order was replacing the old. Mandarampura Puvata, a text from the Kandyan period, narrates the above radical changes to the monastic order and shows that it was not a unanimous decision by the body of the Sangha. It says that thirty-two ‘senior’ members of the Sangha who opposed this change were banished to Jaffna by the leaders of the reform.

The Govigama exclusivity of the Sangha thus secured in 1764 was almost immediately challenged by other castes who without the patronage of the King of Kandy or of the British, held their own upasampada ceremony at Totagamuwa Vihara in 1772. Another was held at Tangalle in 1798. Neither of these ceremonies were approved by the Siam Nikaya which claimed that these were not in accordance with the Vinaya rules. The prominence given to the Govigama and other central region castes is justified as the coastal castes such as Karava, Durava and Salagama were of post-13th Century South Indian Dravidian origin, and not of Sinhala origin. These three coastal recent South Indian origin castes are also highly involved with the Catholic faith where the Karava are the biggest Catholic force of the country.

The principal places of Buddhist worship in Sri Lanka including the Temple of the Tooth Relic, Adam's Peak, Kelaniya and over 6,000 other temples are now under the administration of the Siam Nikaya. From time immemorial the Sacred Tooth Relic of Gautama Buddha has been considered the symbol of the rulers of Sri Lanka. As time went on, the seat of the kingdom was moved from Anuradhapura to Polonnaruwa, then to Dambadeniya and other cities. Upon each change of capital, a new palace was built to enshrine the Relic. Finally, it was brought to Kandy where it is at present, in the Temple of the Tooth. The oldest Buddhist sect in Sri Lanka, the Siam Nikaya (estd. 19 July 1753) has been the custodian of the Tooth Relic, since its establishment during the Kandyan Kingdom. The Siam Nikaya traditionally grants higher ordination only to the Radala and Govigama castes, Sitinamaluwe Dhammajoti (Durawa) being the last non-Govigama monk to receive upasampada. This conspiracy festered within the Siam Nikaya itself and Moratota Dhammakkandha, Mahanayaka of Kandy, with the help of the last two Kandyan Telugu Kings victimised the low country Mahanayaka Karatota Dhammaranma by confiscating the Sri Pada shrine and the retinue villages from the low country fraternity and appointing a rival Mahanayaka. Presently, an exception is the Rangiri Dambulla sect which welcomes all communities while being a Siam Nikaya subsect.

== The number of Siam Nikaya monasteries and monks ==
(Estimates from Ministry of Buddha Sasana, Sri Lanka)

Monasteries	Temples	Number of Monks
Malvatu Parshavaya (including Sri Rohana Parshavaya)	4,923	14,944
Asgiri Parshavaya	565	1,383
Rangiri Dambulu Parshavaya	unknown	200
Mahavihara Vansika Vanavasa Nikaya	71	889
Kotte Sri Kalyani Saamagri Nikaya	85	230
Uve Siamopali	22	78
Total	6018	18,780

== See also ==
- Amarapura Nikāya
- Rāmañña Nikāya
