= Upali Thera =

Founder of Siam Nikāya in Sri Lanka

Upali Thera (Thai: อุบาลี, RTGS: Ubali) was a Thai Theravada monk and founder of the Siam Nikaya order of Buddhism in Sri Lanka. He visited Kandy in 1753 and there performed upasampada (higher ordination, as distinct from samanera or novice ordination) for a group of Sinhala monks. The upasampada was not observed in Sri Lanka for centuries until this time. Upali Thera believed the Buddhist Sangha in Kandy was suffering from a state of corruption, and his efforts were aimed at "purifying" the practices - which included astrology - of the monastic order there. To this end he founded the new monastic order.

It was also through the efforts of Upali Thera that the Procession of the Sacred Tooth Relic was reorganized in its present form. Annually in Kandy there is a celebration which includes a parade in which the focus is a relic believed to be a tooth of the Buddha. This procession was originally focussed on honor to Hindu deities, particularly those incorporated into Sri Lankan Buddhism. Upali Thera believed this to be inappropriate in a Buddhist nation, and his influence led to the king declaring that "Henceforth Gods and men are to follow the Buddha".

== See also ==
- Siam Nikaya
