= Kirti Sri Rajasinha =

King of Kandy from 1747 to 1782

- Thrisinhaladheeshwara; Lankeshwara; Bhupathi; Maharaja
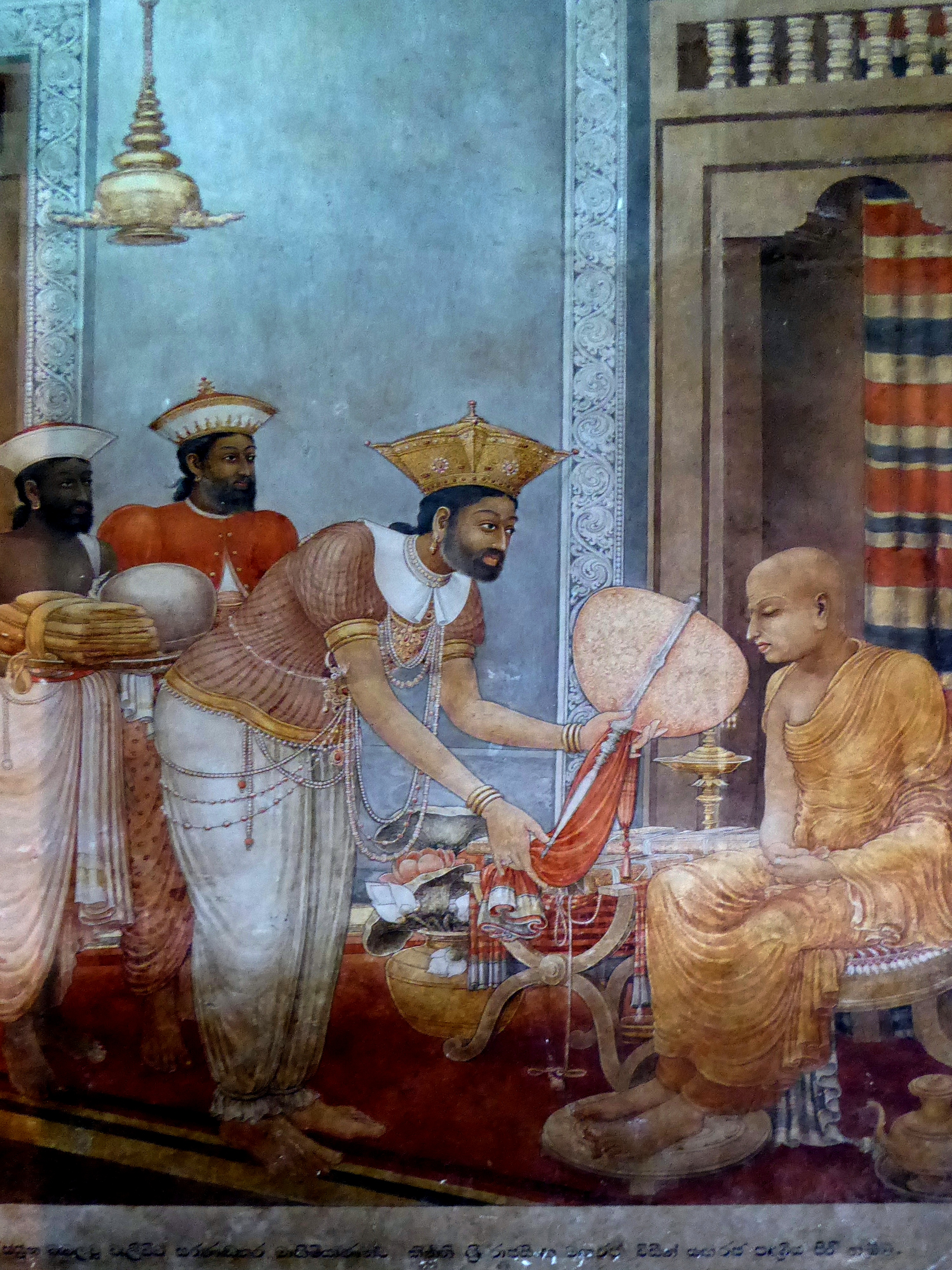
- Kirti Sri Rajasinha and Weliwita Sri Saranankara Thero

King of Kandy
- Reign: 11 August 1747 – 2 January 1782
- Coronation: 1750
- Predecessor: Sri Vijaya Rajasinha
- Successor: Rajadhi Rajasinha
- Born: 1734; South India
- Died: 2 January 1782 (aged 47-48); Kandy, Sri Lanka
- Burial: Royal Cremation Yard, Asgiri Temple, Kandy, Sri Lanka
- Consort: Queen Consort Alamelu (Daughter of Nadukattu Sami Nayakkar)
- Spouses: Three other Royal Concubines from Nayakkar clan; Royal Concubine Mampitiye Devi
- Issue: Prince Mampitiye Wahalabandara Snr. (from Mampitiye Devi); Prince Mampitiye Wahalabandara Jnr. (from Mampitiye Devi); Six daughters (from Mampitiye Devi)
- Sinhala: කීර්ති ශ්‍රී රාජසිංහ
- Tamil: கீர்த்தி ஸ்ரீ ராஜசிங்கம்
- House: Nayakkar
- Father: Lord Narenappa Nayakkar
- Mother: Lady Upendramma Devi
- Religion: Theravada Buddhism and Shaivite Hinduism
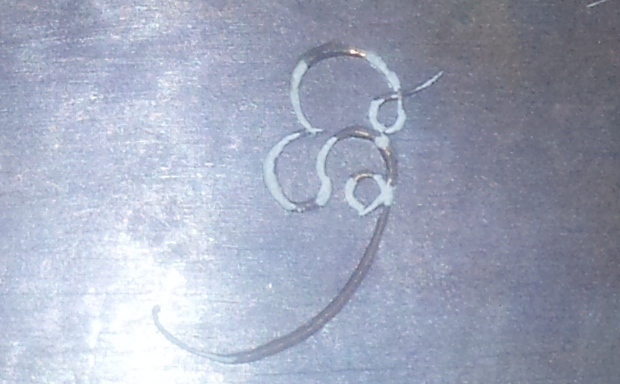
- Signature

Kirti Sri Rajasinha (Sinhala: කීර්ති ශ්‍රී රාජසිංහ, Tamil: கீர்த்தி ஸ்ரீ ராஜசிங்கம்; 1734 – 2 January 1782) was the second Nayaka king of Kandy, ruling from 1747 to 1782. He was a prince from the Madurai Nayak Dynasty and the brother-in-law of Sri Vijaya Raja Singha. He succeeded his brother-in-law to the throne in 1751.

He played a crucial role in reviving Buddhism in Sri Lanka and maintaining the independence of the Kandyan Kingdom during a period of increasing European colonial influence. His reign is noted for significant cultural and religious advancements, particularly in restoring Buddhist institutions and forging diplomatic ties with foreign nations.

He also built the existing inner temple of the Sacred Tooth Relic and Raja Maha Vihara (Gangarama) in Kandy. During his reign the Mahavamsa chronicle was continued from the time of Parakramabahu IV of Dambadeniya. He also rebuilt the Munneswaram temple close to Chilaw. Under the guidance and influence of Weliwita Sri Saranankara Thero, with Dutch assistance, king Kirti Sri Raja Singha successfully invited Bhikkus from Siam (Thailand) to revive the higher ordination of Buddhist monks in Sri Lanka.

== Early life and ascension to throne ==
Keerthi Sri Rajasinha was born into the Nayak dynasty of South India, which had established its rule in Kandy following the decline of the native Sinhalese royal lineage. He succeeded his predecessor, Sri Vijaya Rajasinha, in 1747. As a Tamil-speaking Nayak prince, he initially faced challenges in winning the trust of the predominantly Sinhalese Buddhist populace but gradually gained acceptance due to his commitment to Buddhism and the welfare of the kingdom.

== Religious contributions ==
One of Keerthi Sri Rajasinha’s most notable achievements was his dedication to restoring Buddhism in Sri Lanka, which had suffered under Portuguese and Dutch colonial rule. He sought assistance from Thailand (then Siam) to revive the ordination lineage of Buddhist monks. This led to the arrival of the Siamese monk Upali Thera in 1753, who re-established the higher ordination (Upasampadā) and strengthened the monastic order. As a result, the Siyam Nikaya, one of the major Buddhist monastic orders in Sri Lanka, was formed under his patronage.

The king also undertook the restoration of significant Buddhist temples and monasteries, including the Temple of the Tooth Relic (Sri Dalada Maligawa) in Kandy, which became the spiritual and political heart of the kingdom.

== Relations with colonial powers ==
During his reign, Keerthi Sri Rajasinha had to navigate complex diplomatic and military challenges posed by European colonial powers. The Dutch, who controlled the coastal regions of Sri Lanka, frequently engaged in conflicts and negotiations with the Kandyan Kingdom. The king maintained a cautious approach, resisting direct European control while ensuring that trade and diplomatic relations were sustained when beneficial to the kingdom.

== Cultural and architectonic contributions ==
Keerthi Sri Rajasinha’s reign saw significant developments in literature, art, and architecture. He encouraged the translation of Buddhist texts from Pali and Sanskrit into Sinhala, making them accessible to a broader audience. He also supported traditional dance and music, which flourished under his patronage. The architectural style of the Kandyan period, characterized by intricate wooden carvings and decorative elements, was further developed during his rule.

== Attack on Dutch forts ==
In 1761 King Kirti Sri Rajasinha attacked the Dutch garrisons and forts at Matara, Katuwana, Tangalle, Marakade and Urubokke, completely destroying them, and killing Dutch while some surrendered and ended up as prisoners.

In order to revenge the humiliation, the new Dutch governor Van Eck had immediate plans to attack Kandy, but the weakness in fortification and garrison forbade the Dutch. Later they did attack in 1764 and in 1765. Hence, in the early part of 1763 the Dutch were only consolidating their positions and gradually expelling Kandyans from the territories taken over from Dutch. Throughout 1763 the King continually sought peace and sent his envoys to discuss terms. The Governor wished the King to cede the three four and seven Korales and Puttlam and hand over the entire coastline of island to the Dutch. The king was not agreeable to any demand that diminished his sovereignty and was deliberately delaying a settlement hoping for help from the English in Madras after his discussion and negotiations with John Pybus 1762.

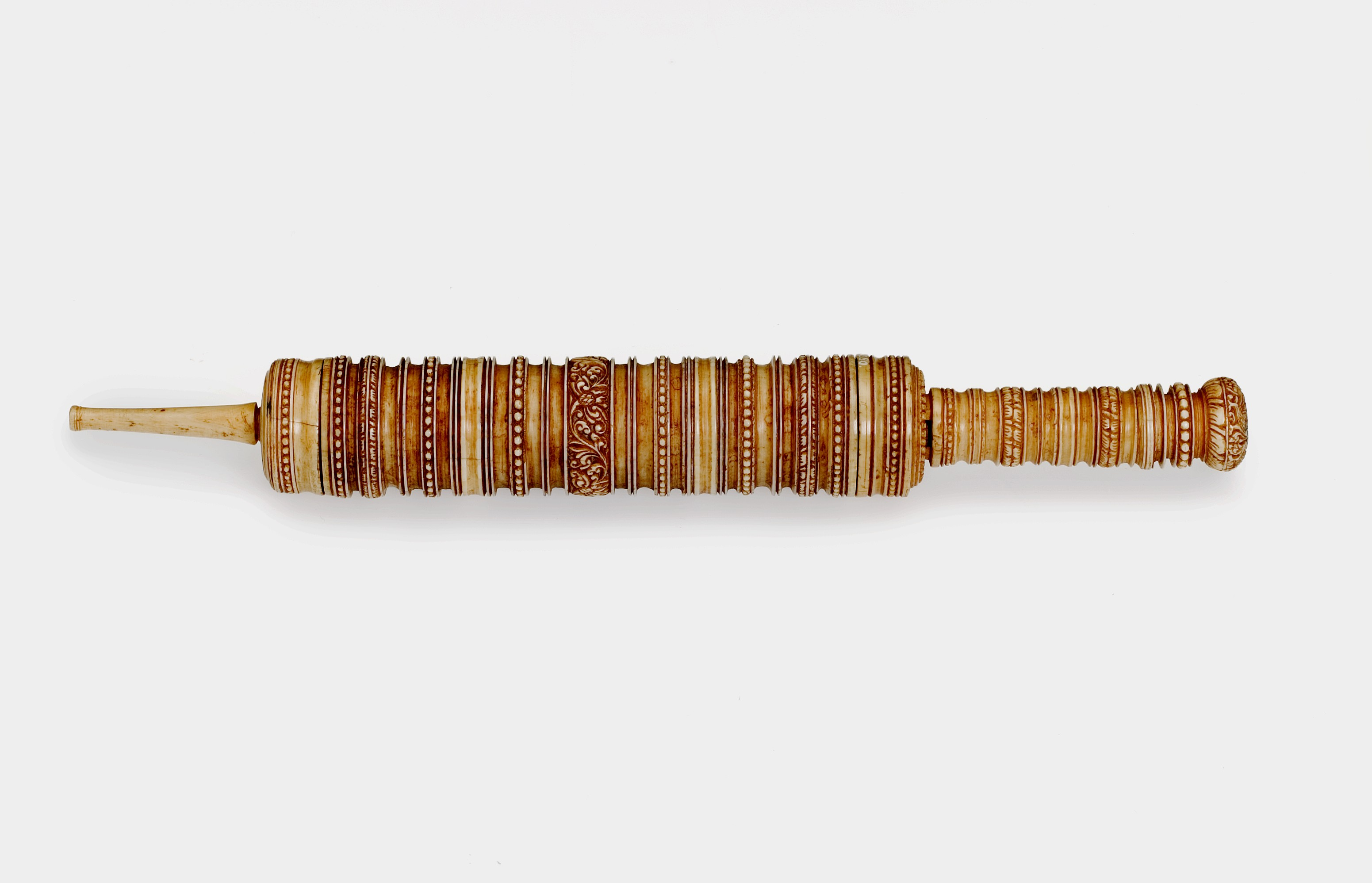
The exquisite ivory enema syringe presented by King Keerthi Sri Rajasinghe to his Royal Physicians, a testament to the importance of enemas in Ayurvedic medicine.

== Meeting with the British ==
The King in mid-1762 sought help from the Governor of Fort St George Madras for assistance. The British eager to obtain the monopoly of trading in cinnamon, pepper, betel nut (puwak) from the Kandyan Kings also wanted to expel the Dutch from the coasts. A reason to call on the British for assistance by the Kandyan King in 1762 was that after the treaty of Paris, the Dutch poured troops into Sri Lanka. They were bent on capturing Kandy from six directions (1764). Anticipating such a scenario the King sent an envoy to the English Governor of Madras to assist him in expelling the Dutch. This envoy, a junior Kandyan Official in the military made a clandestine trip to Madras Fort, and the English responded by sending their councilor Mr Pybus.

John Pybus, a writer of the British East India Company, sailed to Kandy with a backup of five ships and about 200 armed men. A British vessel brought Pybus to Trincomalee on 5 May 1762. The Dutch knew of the arrival of Pybus through their spies and they were kept informed of his movements. Pybus took an exhausting covert trip to meet the King on 24 May 1762. After several talks without any conclusive decisions Pybus left after a month. The King gave him a ring, sword, a gold chain with breast jewels and left the country crossing the river at Puttalam pass while the Dissawa who accompanied Pybus presented the ships commander Samuel Cornish a gold chain and a ring in the name of King "Keerthi Sri Rajasinha ".

John Pybus in his notes described the King as a man of tolerable stature, reddish in complexion and very brisk in his movements. Pybus was amazed as to how the Kandyans had managed to fight a war with Dutch and had captured Matara Dutch Fort. He wrote that "They had put every European to the sword except two officers who are now prisoners of the country."

The Dutch attacked Kandy once again in 1765 and in this occasion, both parties suffered severe casualties. The king went to Hanguranketha and hid there for safety. Battles continued for months and the king wanted peace with the Dutch due to the widening of internal issues of the Kingdom of Kandy. Taking advantage of this opportunity the Dutch forwarded a treaty biased towards the themselves. The king, having no other option signed the treaty in 1766. The Kingdom of Kandy lost its access to the ocean by this treaty.

== Marriage ==
He married the daughter of one Nadukattu Sami Nayakkar in 1749. He further married three more Nayakkar queens from Madurai, but had no children. He also married two daughters of Vijaya Manna Naicker who was the grandson of Vijaya Raghava Nayak. He had six daughters and two sons by his favorite Sinhala lady (Yakada Doli), daughter of the late Dissava (Headman) of Bintenna, granddaughter of the blind and aged Mampitiya Dissave. Both his sons survived the king and his daughters married Nayakkar relatives of the king. Mampitiya’s sons claim for the throne was overlooked and the choice fell on the king’s brother who was living in court.

== Statues ==
There are various life-sized portraits of King Kirti Sri Raja Singha in all of the temples he renovated and built. But the most famous are the four life-sized wooden statues still standing as of today, two of them can be seen at Dambulla temple and at Malwatta temple in Kandy.

== Legacy and death ==
Keerthi Sri Rajasinha died in 1782, leaving behind a legacy as one of the most influential rulers of the Kandyan Kingdom. His efforts in reviving Buddhism laid the foundation for its survival in Sri Lanka, despite colonial pressures. His successor, Rajadhi Rajasinha, continued his policies, maintaining the independence and cultural richness of the Kandyan Kingdom until the British conquest in 1815.

Today, Keerthi Sri Rajasinha is remembered as a pivotal figure in Sri Lankan history, revered for his religious devotion and efforts to preserve the sovereignty and traditions of the Kandyan Kingdom.

== See also ==
- Mahavamsa
- List of monarchs of Sri Lanka
- History of Sri Lanka

== Sources ==
- Kings and Rulers of Sri Lanka

Kirti Sri Rajasinha Kandy Nayakar Dynasty Born: 1721 (Believing) 1721 Died: 2 January 1782
Regnal titles
Preceded by Vijaya Rajasinha	King of Kandy; 11 August 1747–2 January 1782	Succeeded by Sri Rajadhi Rajasinha
