= Thero =

Buddhist honorific

Thero (commonly appearing in the masculine and feminine forms thera and therī respectively) is an honorific term in Pali for senior bhikkhus and bhikkhunis (Buddhist monks and nuns) in the Buddhist monastic order. The word literally means "elder". These terms, appearing at the end of a monastic's given name, are used to distinguish those who have at least 10 years since their upasampadā (higher ordination). The name of an important collections of very early Buddhist poetry are called the Theragāthā and the Therīgāthā, "Verses of the Theras" and Verses of the Therīs".

The terms mahāthera and mahātherī (the prefix mahā meaning 'great' in both Sanskrit and Pali) are used to distinguish those who have at least 20 years since their upasampadā (higher ordination).

Usage of these terms varies according to the Buddhist tradition and culture. In Sri Lanka, these terms are widely used. In Thailand the element also appears inside ecclesiastical titles conferred by the king, as in Phra Visuddhisamvarathera or Phra Suphrommayanathera.

Some prominent theras and therīs:

- Ananda Thera
- Rerukane Chandawimala Maha Thera
- Katukurunde Nyanananda Thera
- Narada Mahathera
- Nyanatiloka Mahathera
- Balangoda Ananda Maitreya Thera
- Mahapajapati Gotami Therī
- Kiribathgoda Gnanananda Thera
- Ayya Tathaaloka Mahātherī
- Gangodawila Soma Thera
- Nyanaponika Thera
- Nanavira Thera
- Phra Visuddhisamvarathera (Ajahn Brahm)
- Phra Suphrommayanathera (Ajahn Tong Sirimangalo)

== See also ==
- Ajahn
- Sayadaw
- Theravada
- Theragatha
- Therigatha
