= List of centenarians (religious figures) =

The following is a list of centenarians – specifically, people who became famous as religious figures – known for reasons other than their longevity. For more lists, see lists of centenarians.

All supercentenarians (above 110 years old)
Living

Name	Lifespan	Age	Reason for Notability
Angelo Acerbi	1925–	101	Cardinal of the Catholic Church
Laban Ainsworth	1757–1858	100	American clergyman and pastor
Carlos Aldunate Lyon	1916–2018	102	Chilean Jesuit priest, master of novices (Pope Francis) and writer
Elizabeth Alfred	1914–2015	101	Australian Anglican priest
Albert Jean Amateau	1889–1996	106	Turkish-born American rabbi
Joseph Anderson	1889–1992	102	American general authority of the Church of Jesus Christ of Latter-day Saints
Saint Anthony the Great	251–356	105	Egyptian Christian saint
Ferdinand Ashmall	1695–1798	103	English Roman Catholic priest who died in the 73rd year of his ministry
Corrado Bafile	1903–2005	101	Italian Roman Catholic cardinal
Teresita Barajuen	1907–2013	105	Spanish cloistered nun; featured in a 2013 book, What is a Girl Like You Doing In A Place Like This?
Giovanni Benedetti	1917–2017	100	Italian Roman Catholic bishop
Pravrajika Bhaktiprana	1920–2022	102	Indian Hindu sannyasini
Dmytro Blazheyovskyi	1910–2011	100	Ukrainian scientist and religious author
Henry Boehm	1775–1875	100	American clergyman and pastor
George William BonDurant	1915–2017	101	American preacher (Restoration Movement of Christianity) and educator
Boro Maa	1918–2019	100–101	Indian Hindu leader, matriarch of the Matua Mahasangha
Joseph Oliver Bowers	1910–2012	102	Dominican Ghanaian Roman Catholic bishop
Adalbert Brunke	1912–2013	101	German Lutheran leader
Loris Francesco Capovilla	1915–2016	100	Italian Roman Catholic cardinal
Jan van Cauwelaert	1914–2016	102	Belgian Roman Catholic bishop
John Cavell	1916–2017	100	British Anglican bishop
Laurence Chaderton	1536–1640	103	English Anglican Puritan divine
Saint Charalambos	89?–202	113?	Ancient Greek bishop
Yehuda Chitrik	1899–2006	106	American rabbi
Jacques Clemens	1909–2018	108	Dutch Roman Catholic priest
James Burton Coffman	1905–2006	101	American Christian preacher and teacher
William C. Conway	1865–1969	104	American mysticism leader
Jorge da Costa	1406–1508	101–102	Portuguese Roman Catholic cardinal
Stephen Cumberbatch	1909–2011	101	Trinidadian Anglican Archdeacon
Quirino De Ascaniis	1908–2009	100	Italian priest
Antônio Afonso de Miranda	1920–2021	101	Brazilian Roman Catholic prelate and Bishop Emeritus of Taubaté
Indra Devi	1899–2002	102	Russian-American yogi
Bhante Dharmawara	1889?–1999	110?	Cambodian-born monk and educator
Ralph Edward Dodge	1907–2008	101	American bishop of the Methodist Church
Angela Mary Doyle	1925–	101	Irish-Australian Catholic nun
George Duggan	1912–2012	100	New Zealand Roman Catholic priest, philosopher, seminary professor and writer
Ephraim Einhorn	1918–2021	103	Austrian rabbi based in Taiwan
Yosef Shalom Eliashiv	1910–2012	102	Israeli rabbi
Hubertus Ernst	1917–2017	100	Dutch Roman Catholic bishop
Christopher Evans	1909–2012	102	English chaplain and theologian
Sophia Lyon Fahs	1876–1978	101	American Unitarian minister, educator and writer
Vincent Foy	1915–2017	101	Canadian Roman Catholic cleric and theologian
Eugene Maxwell Frank	1907–2009	101	American religious leader and Methodist Church bishop
Reginald C. Fuller	1908–2011	102	British Roman Catholic priest
Irineos Galanakis	1911–2013	101	Greek Orthodox bishop
José de Jesús García Ayala	1910–2014	103	Mexican Roman Catholic bishop
Victor Garaygordóbil Berrizbeitia	1915–2018	102	Spanish Roman Catholic bishop
Blanche Gates	1918–2023	105	Canadian Anglican liturgist
Manuel Edmilson da Cruz	1924–	102	Brazilian Roman Catholic bishop
Peter Leo Gerety	1912–2016	104	American Roman Catholic bishop
Davuldena Gnanissara Thero	1915–2017	101	Sri Lankan scholar Buddhist monk and supreme Mahanayaka of the Sri Lanka Amarapura Nikaya
René Henry Gracida	1923–2026	102	American Bishop
Maxine Grimm	1914–2017	102	American LDS Church leader
Ezekiel Guti	1923–2023	100	Zimbabwean evangelist
Nolan Bailey Harmon	1892–1993	100	American Methodist bishop and author
Theodore Heck	1901–2009	108	American Benedictine monk
Augustine Hoey	1915–2017	101	English Anglican priest
Hosius of Corduba (also known as Osius or Ossius)	256–359	102	Bishop of Corduba (now Córdoba, Spain)
Edward Howard	1877–1983	105	American Roman Catholic archbishop
Ben Huan	1907–2012	104	Chinese Buddhist
Damián Iguacén Borau	1916–2020	104	Spanish Roman Catholic bishop
Isaac of Armenia	338–439	100–101	Parthian Catholicos of Armenia
Florence S. Jacobsen	1913–2017	103	American President of the Young Women's Mutual Improvement Association
Sister Jean	1919–2025	106	American Catholic Religious Sister
John the Silent	454–558	104	Greek Christian saint
Meir Just	1908–2010	101	Dutch Chief Rabbi
Yitzhak Kaduri	1899?/1900?–2006	106?	Iraqi-born Orthodox rabbi and kabbalist
Shmuel Kamenetsky	1924–	102	American rabbi
Bruno Kant	1916–2026	110	German Roman Catholic priest
Augoustinos Kantiotes	1907–2010	103	Greek Orthodox bishop
Mordecai Kaplan	1881–1983	102	Lithuanian rabbi and founder of Reconstructionist Judaism
Gregory of Khandzta	759–861	101–102	Georgian saint of the Georgian Orthodox and Apostolic Church
Hossein Wahid Khorasani	1921–2026	105	Iranian ayatollah and author
Consolata Kline	1916–2016	100	American Roman Catholic sister
Myer S. Kripke	1914–2014	100	American rabbi
Guillermo Leaden	1913–2014	100	Argentine Roman Catholic bishop
Felice Leonardo	1915–2015	100	Italian Roman Catholic bishop
Géry Leuliet	1910–2015	104	French Roman Catholic bishop
Albert Malbois	1915–2017	101	French Roman Catholic bishop
Bernard Joseph McLaughlin	1912–2015	102	American Roman Catholic bishop
Weweldeniye Medhalankara Thero	1909–2012	102	Sri Lankan Buddhist monk and Mahanayaka of Sri Lanka Ramanna Nikaya
Antonio Rosario Mennonna	1906–2009	103	Italian Roman Catholic bishop
Halvor Midtbø	1883–1985	101	Norwegian priest and temperance activist
Richard Millard	1914–2018	103	American episcopal prelate and bishop of California (1960–1978)
William McElwee Miller	1892–1993	100	American missionary and author
Francesco Minerva	1904–2004	100	Italian archbishop emeritus of Lecce
Paul Mwazha	1918–2025	107	Zimbabwean clergyman
Narcissus of Jerusalem	c. 99?–c. 215	116?	Ancient Roman Greek Orthodox Patriarch of Jerusalem
Oswald von Nell-Breuning	1890–1991	101	German Roman Catholic theologician and sociologist
Russell M. Nelson	1924–2025	102	President of the Church of Jesus Christ of Latter Day Saints
Nguyễn Khắc Ngư	1909–2009	100	Vietnamese Roman Catholic bishop
Nguyễn Văn Thiện	1906–2012	106	Vietnamese Roman Catholic bishop
Arturo Paoli	1912–2015	102	Italian priest and missionary
Paul of Thebes	227?–341	113?	Egyptian Christian saint
Odorico Leovigildo Sáiz Pérez	1912–2012	100	Spanish Roman Catholic bishop
Philipose Mar Chrysostom Mar Thoma	1918–2021	103	Indian bishop of Mar Thoma Syrian Church.
Bernardino Piñera	1915–2020	104	French-born Chilean Roman Catholic bishop
Muhammad Qadiri	1552–1654	101	Pakistani Islamic scholar and preacher
Chatral Rinpoche	1913–2015	102	Tibetan Buddhist yogi
Lotfollah Safi Golpaygani	1919–2022	102	Iranian marja'
Nicholas Salamis	1897–2005	108	Greek-born Canadian Greek Orthodox priest
Tom Salmon	1913–2013	100	Irish Anglican cleric
Kyozan Joshu Sasaki	1907–2014	107	Japanese Rinzai Zen teacher
James Schaffer	1910–2014	104	American Christian leader
Chaim Pinchas Scheinberg	1910–2012	101	Israeli rabbi
Aharon Yehuda Leib Shteinman	1913–2017	103–104	Israeli Haredi rabbi and posek
Elazar Shach	1899–2001	102	Israeli leading Haredi rabbi
Eldred G. Smith	1907–2013	106	American former Presiding Patriarch of The Church of Jesus Christ of Latter-day Saints
Andreas Peter Cornelius Sol	1915–2016	100	Dutch Roman Catholic bishop
Mack B. Stokes	1911–2012	100	American bishop of the Methodist Church
Shivakumara Swami	1907–2019	111	Indian religious leader
Tillit Sidney Teddlie	1885–1987	102	American hymnalist and pastor
Tenkai	1536–1643	106–107	Japanese Tendai Buddhist monk
Balangoda Ananda Maitreya Thero	1896–1998	101	Sri Lankan scholar-monk
Settimio Todisco	1924–2025	100	Italian Roman Catholic prelate
Nicholas Kao Se Tseien	1897–2007	110	Chinese Catholic priest and oldest person ever to have a cataract operation
Marian Tumler	1887–1987	100	Austrian theologian and Grand Master of the Teutonic Order
(Somdet Phra Sangharaja Chao Krommaluang) Vajirañāṇasaṃvara	1913–2013	100	19th Supreme Patriarch of Thailand
Agnès-Marie Valois	1914–2018	103	French nun and World War II nurse
Francisco Raúl Villalobos Padilla	1921–2022	101	Mexican prelate of the Roman Catholic Church
Daniel Waldo	1762–1864	101	American clergyman
Warren Prall Watters	1890–1992	102	American founding archbishop of the Free Church of Antioch
Herbert George Welch	1862–1969	106	American Methodist bishop and president of Ohio Wesleyan University
Eleutherius Winance	1909–2009	100	Belgian monk and co-founder of St. Andrew's Abbey
Shmuel Wosner	1913–2015	101	Israeli Haredi rabbi
Gershon Yankelewitz	1909–2014	105	Belarusian-born American rabbi
