= Palane Vajiragnana Thera =

Sri Lankan Buddhist monk and scholar

Pelene Sri Vajiragnana Maha Thera
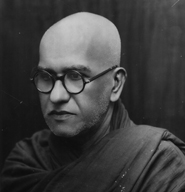
- Pelene Sri Vajiragnana Mahanayaka Thera
- Title: Mahanayaka of Amarapura Sri Dharmarakshita Sect "Sri Dharmarkshita Vamsālankāra Dharmakirti"

Personal life
- Born: Don Aron Pandita Gunawardena; July 28, 1878 Pelana, Matara
- Died: September 21, 1955 (aged 77) Colombo
- Education: Vidyodaya Pirivena

Religious life
- Religion: Buddhism
- School: Theravada
- Lineage: Amarapura
- Dharma name: Palane Vajiragnana Mahanayaka Thera

Senior posting
- Teacher: Weragampita Siri Revata Thera; Hikkaduwe Sri Sumangala Thera

Palane Vajiragnana Thera (November 25, 1878 – September 21, 1955) was a Sri Lankan (Sinhala) scholar Buddhist monk, who founded the Siri Vajiraramaya temple in Bambalapitiya, Sri Lanka. He was also the Maha Nayaka (head) of Amarapura Sri Dharmarakshita sect for 37 years from August 5, 1918, until his death in 1955.

== Early life ==
Palane Vajiragnana Thera was born to a family in Pelene, Weligama in Matara District on 28 July 1878. His father was Muhandiram Don Andris Tudawe Pandita Gunawardene, a well known Oriental scholar at the time and his mother was Dona Gimara Serasinghe. His lay name was Aron Pandita Gunawardena. Aron had his early education at the village vernacular school and for his English education he was sent to the bilingual school at Mirissa. At the age of 15, on July 20, 1890, he was ordained a monk under the tutelage of Weragampita Siri Revata Maha Thera, who was himself a well known oriental and Buddhist scholar, at Devagiri Vihara, Kabmurugamuwa with the given name Palane Vajiranana. In 1897, he was admitted to Vidyodaya Pirivena, Colombo under Hikkaduwe Sri Sumangala Mahanāyaka Thera and passed in 1900 winning the Siyāmarāja Prize for the best student of that year. He received higher ordination on April 20, 1900, at the Udakakkhepa Sima on River Nilvalā in Matara.

== Establishment of Siri Vajirārāmaya Temple ==
In the 1880s the Buddhists living in Bambalapitiya area formed a society with the name Dharma Samagama, meaning Dharma Society. Later they built a hall for the preaching of the Dhamma (Dharma Sālāwa). They constructed a small room with basic facilities as an adjunct and in 1901 invited young Pelene Vajirañāna to come and reside. He was brought in procession from his temporary residence in Siri Suviddharamaya, Wellawatta. This was the genesis of the present Vajirārāmaya and gradually he built it up with a character of its own. A Bo tree was planted to symbolise Buddha's Enlightenment and a small Vihara-ge was later constructed with a serene seated Buddha image. In 1909 Muhandiram P. J. Kulatilake built the library with two rooms and donated it to the Sangha. The Vajirārāma Dhamma School was started in 1918 and among the students who studied in this Dhamma School were future leading politicians of Sri Lanka. Dudley Senanayake, J. R. Jayewardene, Bernard Zoysa, R. Premadasa, Chandrika Bandaranaike and Anura Bandaranaike, Lalith Athulathmudali were a few such leaders.

== Scholarship ==
He was considered by his students to be knowledgeable of the Buddhist Texts (Tipitaka), the commentaries and the sub commentaries. Many of his articles are compiled and published under the title Sri Vajrañāna Sahitya. He was made a member of the Pracheena Bhasopakara Samitiya in 1905 on the recommendation of Hikkaduwe Sri Sumangala Mahanayaka Thera and seconded by Sri Subhuti Mahanayaka Thera. He was only 27 years of age.

Among his contemporaries were Kalukondayave Pannasekera Mahanayaka Thera, Anagarika Dharmapala, Piyadasa Sirisena, W. A. Silva, Sir D. B. Jayatilaka, Dr G. P. Malalasekera and Kumaratunga Munidasa. In 1937, he started the Bauddha Lamaya magazine in Sinhala and it had continued to date as a monthly publication of the Vajirārāmaya temple. For the English speaking Buddhist children a similar magazine called 'Bosat' was started. In addition, a magazine called Lak Budu Sasuna was commenced to which he contributed regularly.

== Broadcaster ==
Pelene Vajirañāna Maha Thera was the first broadcaster of a Buddhist Sermon over the radio in Sri Lanka. It was delivered on April 21, 1928. His style of delivery was followed by his pupil monks. The head of the Vidyodaya Pirivena, Mahagoda Ñanissara Thera, said that Pelene Thera has mastered the 'pelena' (plan) to deliver effective sermons.

== Vajirārāmaya Tradition ==
Pelene Mahanayaka Thera was very concerned with following the monastic rules of discipline as mentioned in the Pāṭimokkha. All monks at Vajirārāmaya were distinct because of this and were easily recognised. Some of the notable features were the shaving of both the head and beard at same time, using of the alms-bowl for partaking of meals, using a natural dye made by boiling the root of jack trees and bark of banyan trees when preparing robes. This unique colour of the robe came to be known as the ‘Vajirārāma-colour’, and the dye made by incorporating this colour was known ‘Vajirārāma-dye’. Rules and procedures pertaining to Vajirārāmaya and the monks ordained by him were laid down in the Vajirārāma Katikavata of January 12, 1940.

== Pupils ==
Following the tradition of teacher to pupil, he passed down his vast knowledge of the Dhamma and the high monastic traditions he meticulously followed to his pupil monks who in their own way became great achievers. His first pupil was Narada Maha Thera, a Buddhist scholar monk and missionary. Other Maha Theras were Madihe Pannasiha, Piyadassi, Ampitiye Rahula, Ñāṇamoli and Ñāṇavīra English monks. Amitananda Maha Thera and Subhodanada Thera of Nepal were also his pupils. Madihe Paññāsiha Maha Thera, one of his pupils, succeeded him as the Mahanayaka of the Amarapura Sri Dharmarakshita sect. In addition to this, theras such as Kamburugamuwa Mahanama, Denipitiye Sumanasiri, Koggala Rohana, Soma Thera, Kheminda Thera, Walgama Sugathananda, Panvila Vipassi, Urugamuwe Senananda, Pamburana Metteyya, Naotunne Gunasiri and Bambalapitiye Kassapa were the student theras of Pelene Mahanayake Thera.

== Honours and death ==
After an illness Pelene Vajirañāna Mahanayaka Thera died on September 21, 1955. With State patronage he was cremated in the presence of over 500,000 devotees of all ranks and religions at the Independence Square Esplanade on September 25, 1955. His cremation was reported in the local Press (Dinamina) the next day in the following terms:

The Encyclopaedia consisting of the entire Tripitaka, along with the commentaries and sub-commentaries, written in attractive and simple Sinhala has turned to ashes;

The living exemplar of monastic discipline has turned to ashes;

The golden relic casket enshrining the Sinhala, Pali and Sanskrit languages has turned to ashes;

The golden scribe that showed how to write prose and verse in Sinhala, Pali and Sanskrit languages has turned to ashes;

The emissary sent by Maha Brahma to this world to show the way to teach the Buddha Dhamma has turned to ashes;

The pinnacle of the Sambuddha Sasana in recent times has dropped and has turned to ashes;

In other words, the body of the Most Venerable Sri Dharmavamsalankara Pelene Sri Vajirañāna Mahanayaka Thera was cremated at the Independence Square Esplanade.

== Notes and references ==
- Sri Vajrañāna Sahityaya 1 & 2 compiled by Ven Madihe Paññāsiha Mahanayaka Thera, 1960
- Sasunambara Payu Supun Sanda by Ven Tirikunamale Ananda Anunayaka Thera, 2013 ISBN 978-955-8048-85-6
- Guna Pabanda (Collection of Articles of Most Venerable Pelene Vajirañāna), 1956
- Siri Vajirañāna Charitaya by David Karunaratne, 1955
- Tipitaka Dharmakosaya, Ven Sri Vajirañāna Commemorative Volume, 1978
- Dinamina National Newspaper of September 26, 1955
- Siridamräki Sanga Parapura, Tangalle Dirilakuru, 1978
- Pujita Jivita, Vol.1, 1989
