= Amarapura–Rāmañña Nikāya =

Buddhist monastic order

- අමරපුර–රාමඤ්ඤ සාමග්‍රී මහා සංඝ සභාව
- Formation: 16 August 2019; 6 years ago
- Merger of: Amarapura Nikāya; Rāmañña Nikāya
- Type: Monastic order
- Leader: Makulawe Wimala Thera; Karagoda Uyangoda Maithri Murthy Thera
- Key people: Nāpāna Pemasiri Thera, Koṭugoḍa Dhammāvāsa Thera
- Website: http://www.amarapuraramanna.org/

The Amarapura–Rāmañña Nikāya (Sinhala: අමරපුර–රාමඤ්ඤ සාමග්‍රී මහා සංඝ සභාව, romanized: Amarapura–Rāmañña Sāmagrī Mahā Saṁgha Sabhāva) is the larger of the two Buddhist monastic orders (Pali: nikāya) in Sri Lanka, the other being the Siyam Nikāya.

== History ==
The order came into existence on August 16, 2019 through the union of the Amarapura Nikāya and Rāmañña Nikāya, which had been in the works for a number of years. Koṭugoḍa Dhammāvāsa Thera notably underscored that there was no need to maintain two separate orders.

== Forest monasticism ==
Siri Kalyāṇī Yogassama Santhā, an independent division of the Amarapura–Rāmañña Nikāya, is currently the largest body of forest monks and nuns in Sri Lanka.

== See also ==
- Theravāda Buddhism
- Buddhism in Sri Lanka
- Siyam Nikāya
