= Napane Pemasiri Thera =

Sri Lankan monk (died 2020)

Ven. Napane Pemasiri Thera
- Title: Chief Incumbent of the Menikhinna Hurikaduwa Vidyasagara Privena

Personal life
- Born: 2 January 1922
- Died: 17 November 2020 (aged 98)

Religious life
- Religion: Buddhism
- School: Theravada
- Lineage: Amarapura–Rāmañña Nikāya
- Dharma names: Most Ven. Aggamaha Panditha Napane Pemasiri Thera

Most Venenerable Aggamaha Panditha Napane Pemasiri Thera (Sinhala: නාපාන පෙමසිරි ථෙර, romanized: Nāpāna Pemasiri Thera) also spelt either as Napane Premasiri Thera or Napane Pemasiri Thera (2 January 1922/1923 – 17 November 2020) was a Sri Lankan Sinhalese Buddhist monk. He served as the 13th head of the Ramanna Nikaya since September 2012 and also served as the chief incumbent of Menikhinna Hurikaduwa Vidyasagara Privena. He was ordained on 8 July 1933.

On 3 September 2012, he was appointed as the 13th Maha Nayaka of the Ramanna Nikaya succeeding Weweldeniye Medhalankara Thera who died in August 2012. On August 16, 2019, Pemasiri and Koṭugoḍa Dhammāvāsa Thera presided over the union of the Amarapura and Rāmañña monastic orders, creating the Amarapura–Rāmañña Nikāya; both monks jointly headed the new order. Napane Pemasiri Thera died on 17 November 2020 at the age of 98 while receiving treatment at the Peradeniya Teaching Hospital. The funeral ceremony was held at Bandaranaike National school grounds, Kundasale on 22 November 2020. The funeral proceedings were held with full state honors.

Buddhist titles
Preceded by Weweldeniye Medhalankara Thera	Mahanayaka of Sri Lanka Ramanna Nikaya; 2012 - 2020	Succeeded by Makulawe Wimala Thera
