= Ampitiye Rahula Maha Thera =

Sri Lankan Buddhist monk and educator

Ven. Ampitiye Rahula Maha Thera
- අම්පිටියේ ශ්‍රී රාහුල හිමි
- Title: Chief Incumbent of the Maharagama Sri Vajiragnana Dharmayathanaya

Personal life
- Born: Dharmadasa; 24 December 1913 Ampitiya, Kandy, Central Province, Sri Lanka
- Died: 17 February 2020 (aged 106)
- Parent(s): Simon Rajapaksha (father); Karuna Rajapaksha (mother)
- Education: St. Mary's College, Kandy, University of Peradeniya
- Other name: Loku Hamuduruwo

Religious life
- Religion: Buddhism
- School: Theravada
- Dharma names: Ven. Ampitiye Rahula Maha Thera

Venerable Ampitiye Rahula Maha Thera also known as Ampitiye Sri Rahula Maha Thera, and alternatively spelled as Ampitiye Rahula Maha Thera (24 December 1913/1914 – 17 February 2020) (Sinhala: අම්පිටියේ ශ්‍රී රාහුල හිමි), was a Sinhalese Buddhist monk. He held the position of Chief incumbent at the Maharagama Sri Vajiragnana Dharmayathanaya and served as a senior advisor to the Supreme Council of the Amarapura Dharmarakshitha Maha Nikaya until his death. He was known by the honorific title "Loku Hamuduruwo" (ලොකු හමුදුරුවෝ).

== Biography ==
Born as Dharmadasa on 24 December 1913 or 1914 in Ampitiya, Kandy, he received his early education at St. Mary's College, Kandy. Raised by devoutly Buddhist parents, he was sent to a Dhamma school at Alukgolla Raja Maha Viharaya to deepen his understanding of Buddhism.

At the age of 22, on 4 May 1936, he ordained as a Buddhist monk and underwent higher ordination at Udakukkhepa Seema Malakaya in Kelaniya on 30 July 1936. He furthered his studies at the hermitage affiliated with the University of Peradeniya under the guidance of Madihe Pannaseeha Thera. His knowledge of Buddhism was also nurtured by Palane Vajiragnana Thera and Ahangama Sri Pragnaloka Maha Thera. In 1948, he assumed the role of Principal at Vajirarama Dhamma School.

Venerable Rahula Maha Thera extended his teachings to undergraduates in Sinhala and Tamil at the University of Peradeniya and played a role in establishing a Buddhist temple within the university campus. He counted monks such as Maharagama Dhammasiri Thera, Gangodawila Soma Thera and Thirikunamale Ananda Thera among his students. In 1958, he co-founded the Maharagama Bhikku Training Centre alongside his mentor, Madihe Pannaseeha Thera.

== Death ==
Venerable Ampitiye Rahula Maha Thera died on the morning of 17 February 2020 at the venerable age of 106. His funeral took place on 20 February 2020 and was attended by President Gotabaya Rajapaksa.
