= Ambagahawatte Indrasabhawara Gnanasami Maha Thera =

Founder of Rāmañña Nikāya, Buddhist monastic order in Sri Lanka

Ambagahawatte Indrasabhawara Gnanasami Maha Thera අතිපූජ්‍යය අඹගහවත්තේ ඉන්ද්‍රාසභවර ඤාණසාමි මහා ථේර
- Title: Sasanawansa Kawidhaja, Sirisaddhammacariya, Yati Sanghapati, Indrasabhawara Gnanasami, 1st Maha Nayaka Thera (Ramanna Nikaya)

Personal life
- Born: Cornelis Madanayake; 16 November 1832 Ambagahawatta, Akmeemana, Sri Lanka
- Died: 29 January 1886 (aged 54)
- Parent(s): Don Mathes de Silva Madanayake and Indipola Walawwage Jenohamy

Religious life
- Religion: Buddhism
- School: Theravada
- Lineage: Ramanna Nikaya
- Ordination: 1861 in Burma

Senior posting
- Teacher: Most Ven. Akmeemana Sobhitha Maha Thera, Most Ven. Benthota Atthadassi Maha Thera and Most Ven. Neyyadhamamunivara Sangharaja Maha Thera
- Successor: Most Ven. Deepegoda Saddhammawara Jotipala Silakkhandha Maha Thera

Most Ven. Ambagahawatte Indrasabhawara Gnanasami Maha Thera (Sinhala: අතිපූජ්‍ය අඹගහවත්තේ ඉන්ද්‍රාසභවර ඤාණසාමි මහා ථේර; legal name: Cornelis Madanayake) was the founder of Sri Lanka Ramanna Nikaya and Sri Dharmagupta Pirivena of Mūla Maha Viharaya, Payagala, Kalutara. He was the first Maha Nayaka Thera of Sri Lanka Ramanna Nikaya.

== See also ==
- Sri Lankan Buddhism
- Siam Nikaya
- Amarapura Nikaya
- Ramanna Nikaya
- Weweldeniye Medhalankara Thera
- Nauyane Ariyadhamma Mahathera
