= Gangodawila Soma Thera =

Sri Lankan Buddhist monk and preacher

- ගංගොඩවිල සෝම හිමි
- Title: Chief Incumbent of Buddhist Temple Victoria (Australia); Chief Incumbent of Siri Vajiragnana Dharmayathanaya (Sri Lanka)

Personal life
- Born: Weeratunga Arachchige Don Somaratne; 24 April 1948 Gangodawila, Sri Lanka
- Died: 12 December 2003 (aged 55) Saint Petersburg, Russia
- Education: Isipathana College; Maharagama Bhikkhu Training Centre

Religious life
- Religion: Buddhism
- Denomination: Theravada
- School: Amarapura Nikaya, Ananda Sastralaya, Kotte
- Dharma names: Gangodawila Soma Thera

Senior posting
- Teacher: Madihe Pannaseeha Thera; Ampitiye Rahula Maha Thera
- Website: www.gangodawilasomathera.com

Gangodawila Soma Thera (24 April 1948 – 12 December 2003) was a Theravada bhikkhu (Buddhist monk) from Sri Lanka. Following tradition, the Thera used the name of his birthplace, Gangodawila, in front of his dharma name; Thera denotes an elder monk. A prominent preacher and social reformer, Ven. Soma Thera played a pivotal role in the revival of Sinhala Buddhism in Sri Lanka during the late 20th century. His accessible sermons, broadcast on television, inspired thousands, particularly youth, to embrace Buddhist principles. Soma Thera founded the Buddhist Vihara Victoria in Australia and led campaigns against alcoholism, growing individualism and superstition. His sudden death in 2003 sparked controversy, with a Presidential Commission yielding mixed conclusions. Soma Thera's legacy endures through commemorative events, a postal stamp, and his influence on Buddhist activism.

== Early life and education ==
Born Weeratunga Arachchige Don Somaratne on 24 April 1948 in Gangodawila, a suburb of Colombo, Ven. Soma Thera was the eldest son of Don Dharmadasa and Hettige Dona Charlotte. He had four siblings, one of whom died young. The family initially lived on Tonic Mill Road before moving to Josswell Place, Mirihana. The Thera began his education at Rewatha College, Gangodawila, later attending Ananda Sastralaya in Kotte and completing studies at Isipathana College, Colombo, where he played rugby and cricket.

Before ordination, Somaratne ran a small shop in Mirihana and studied Dhamma at Vajiraramaya Temple, Bambalapitiya, developing an interest in Abhidhamma. Inspired by Ven. Ampitiye Rahula Thera, he decided to become a monk despite initial parental objections. In 1976, at age 26, he entered the Siri Vajiragnana Dharmayatanaya in Maharagama, observing the eight precepts, and were ordained as Gangodawila Soma Thera on 20 September 1976 under the tutelage of Madihe Pannaseeha Thera, Mahanayake of the Amarapura Nikaya, and Ven. Ampitiye Rahula Thera. He received higher ordination in 1978. His training at Vajiraramaya and Sri Vajiragnana Dharmayatanaya, key centers of the Amarapura Nikaya, provided access to prominent Buddhist scholars and resources. Further studies at the Bhikkhu Training Centre, Maharagama, focused on Pali Buddhist texts within the Theravada tradition.

== Teachings ==
Soma Thera was renowned for efforts to revive Buddhist practice in Sri Lanka, which had declined due to colonial influences and socio-political unrest since the 16th century. His sermons, delivered in simple Sinhala, emphasised the Five Precepts, diligence, and mindfulness, urging followers to overcome "Thina-middha" (sloth and torpor). Soma Thera campaigned against alcoholism, individualism, superstition, and deity worship, advocating a return to core Sinhalese Buddhist principles. As a proponent of vegetarianism, he spoke against killing animals for meat and meat consumption.

His television program, Anduren Eliyata (From Darkness to Light), aired on ITN and TNL, attracted thousands, particularly young audiences, earning them the title of Sri Lanka's first "television bhikkhu." The Thera also promoted practical skills, such as learning English, to empower youth, and engaged in public debates, notably defending Buddhist sites like Dighavapi against encroachments. His book, Buddhist Stupa, contributed to their scholarly reputation.

== Australia and Buddhist Vihara ==
Soma Thera first visited Australia in 1986, invited by Sri Lankan Buddhists in Melbourne to preach Dhamma. After returning in 1989, he established the Buddhist Vihara Victoria in Noble Park in 1993 to promote Theravada Buddhism among Sri Lankans and other communities. He later founded the Sakyamuni Sambuddha Vihara in Berwick, purchasing a 2.0 ha (5 acres) plot and planting 800 trees. During his time in Australia, the Thera launched campaigns to reconstruct irrigation tanks in rural Sri Lanka, supporting agricultural communities.

== Death ==
Soma Thera died on 12 December 2003 in Saint Petersburg, Russia, aged 56, while attending a ceremony to accept an honorary doctorate from the St. Petersburg International University of Theology for their book Buddhist Stupa. He suffered a heart attack, were admitted to a hospital, and underwent two emergency operations but did not survive. His cremation took place on 24 December 2003 at Independence Square, Colombo, with full state patronage.

The circumstances of his death sparked controversy. An autopsy confirmed natural causes, but some Buddhist groups alleged foul play, citing a born-again Christian fundamentalist conspiracy. A Presidential Commission, appointed to investigate, was divided: two members concluded a conspiracy by a Christian group, while one attributed the death to natural causes. Public reaction led to tensions, prompting President Chandrika Kumaratunga to warn against anti-Christian violence. Buddhist organisations, including the Amarapura Sangha Sabha, demanded an impartial inquiry.

== Legacy ==
Soma Thera's contributions to Sinhala Buddhism remain influential. His sermons inspired a Buddhist revival, particularly among youth, and led to the formation of the Janavijaya organisation in 2001 to promote Buddhist values. The Thera's book Buddhist Stupa and media presence, including Anduren Eliyata, left a lasting impact. Commemorative events, such as the second, 16th, and 20th death anniversaries, reflect his enduring influence, with ceremonies held at Siri Vajirarama Temple and abroad.

In 2024, Sri Lanka issued a postal stamp in his honour, recognising his contributions to Dhamma propagation and social service. A statue was unveiled at the Sakyamuni Sambuddha Vihara in Berwick, Australia, on his 73rd birthday in 2021. Plans for a museum in his honour were announced in 2004. The 20th anniversary in 2023 included a book launch of Gautama the Buddha, compiled by Jin Jayasinghe, at Siri Vajirarama Temple. His influence on Vesak celebrations also persists, with his efforts making the festival more meaningful for Sri Lankan Buddhists.
