= Rāmañña Nikāya in Myanmar =

Mon Buddhist monastic order

Rāmañña Nikāya Sect
- ဂိုဏ်ရာမညနိကာယ
- Abbreviation: Rāmañña Nikāya
- Formation: 1852
- Type: Buddhist monastic order
- Headquarters: Mawlamyine,Myanmar
- Members: 11,283 (2024)
- Leader: Bhaddanta Ketu

Rāmañña Nikāya Sect (Burmese: ရာမညနိကာယဂိုဏ်း; Mon: ဂိုဏ်ရာမညနိကာယ) is a prominent Mon Buddhist monastic order primarily located in the Union of Myanmar. According to the official regulations of the Myanmar government, which recognize a total of nine legal monastic sects, the Rāmañña Nikāya is not included among them. Legally, monks and monasteries belonging to the Rāmañña Nikāya in Myanmar are registered under the three recognized sects of Sudhammā, Shwegyin, Mahāyin. According to the 2024 (Burmese Era 1386) monastic census, the Rāmañña Nikāya consists of:

- Total monasteries: 1,177
- Monks (bhikkhus): 6,608
- Novices (sāmaṇeras): 4,675
- Total monastics: 11,283

While the Rāmañña Nikāya is not officially recognized as a separate legal entity in Myanmar, it is the largest of the three major monastic sects in Sri Lanka. The Sri Lankan Rāmañña Nikāya was established by the Venerable Ambagahawatte Indrasabhawara Ñāṇasāmi Mahā Thera, who received his higher ordination at Ratana Punna Vihara in Myanmar before returning to Sri Lanka in 1864.

== History ==
Historical records indicate that during the reign of King Dhammazedi, who ruled over the three Mon provinces, the Sangha (monastic community) was divided into six different sects. Seeking to purify the religion, King Dhammazedi sent a group of monks to the Mahāvihāra tradition in Sri Lanka to receive new higher ordination at the Kalyani Sīmā. Upon their return, these monks re-ordained the clergy throughout the Mon regions. This unified the Mon monastic orders into a single lineage known as the Mahāvihāra-Kalyani Nikaya. Therefore, the modern Rāmañña Nikāya can be traced back to the Sri Lankan Mahāvihāra lineage of King Dhammazedi’s era. In the Mon language, this sect is colloquially called “Goin Jnor ဂိုဏ်ဇၞော်” (“The Great Sect”).

After Mon territories fell under Burmese control, Mon monks performed ecclesiastical acts (kamma) together with other monks and were categorized under the Sudhammā Sect.

Following the First Anglo-Burmese War, the Martaban region (then Tenasserim) came under British rule. Mon monks who had fled to Thailand returned to revive the Mon religious tradition. In 1852 (B.E. 1214), at the request of Mon monks, the British government formally recognized the Rāmañña Nikāya for the first time. The first Supreme Leader (Gaing-oke) was the abbot of Sakkaw Village in Bilu Kyun (Chaungzon).

In 1920 (B.E. 1282), Mon monks held the Rāmañña Nikāya Association meeting at Maha Waiyan Bon Monastery in Kawhnat Village, Mawlamyine. They sent a formal letter to the British governor stating that they did not wish to be under the authority of the Thathanabaing (Supreme Patriarch) appointed in Upper Burma.

On December 27, 1946, a major conference was held in Panga Village. The Venerable Abbot Kesara of Veluvana Monastery in Pa-auk Village was appointed as the Supreme Leader.

On May 6, 2018 (B.E. 1380), the sect appointed the Most Venerable Bhadanta Tejawanta as its leader. At the time of his appointment, he was 96 years old, with 76 years in the monkhood, and was recognized for his seniority, discipline, and wisdom.

In 2021–2022, prominent Mon sayadaws and the New Mon State Party petitioned the State Administration Council for official recognition as an independent sect.

== Mahānāyaka Theras of Rāmañña Nikāya ==
The following is a list of Mahānāyaka Theras of Mon Rāmañña Nikāya.

1852 Sayadaw of Sakkaw, Sakkaw Monastery (ဘာသက္ကော), Bilu Kyun
1920 – 1946 Sayadaw of Bar-Paloit West Monastery (ဘာပလိုတ်), Panga Village
1946 – 1956 Bhaddanta Sila Teja, West Monastery (ဘာပလိုတ်), Panga Village
1956 – 1964 Bhaddanta Khema, Kyaik Monastery (ဘာကျာ်), Kyaikmaraw
1964 – 1969 Bhaddanta Indasara, Taka Monastery (ဘာတင်္ကာ), Zin Kyaik
1969 – 1976 Bhaddanta Punyarambha, Wa Monastery (ဘာဝါ), Htung-aing Village
1976 – 1979 Bhaddanta Paninda, Sima Monastery (ဘာသိမ်), Taung-maw Village
1979 – 1980 Bhaddanta Pannadipa, Ang-khay Monastery (ဘာအင်ခေဝ်), Ang-khay Village
1980 – 1982 Bhaddanta Ketumala, Toke Monastery (ဘာတိုက်), Baw Village
1982 – 1987 Bhaddanta Silavamsa, West Monastery (ဘာပလိုတ်), Panga Village
1987 – 1989 Bhaddanta Kosalla, Pitakat Monastery (ဘာပိဋကတ်), Mudon
1989 – 1990 Bhaddanta Pannajoti, Toke Monastery (ဘာတိုက်), Tamo-kneing Village
1990 – 1994 Bhaddanta Nandavamsa, Great Monastery(ဘာဇၞော်), Kaw-boit Village
1994 – 2000 Bhaddanta Kuvera, Win-ray Monastery (ဘာဝင်ရာဲ), Win-ray Village
2000 – 2010 Bhaddanta Silavanta, Dat-paung-kaw Monastery (ဘာဓါတ်ပံင်ကောံ), Yangon
2010 – 2015 Bhaddanta Vamsadipa, Old Monastery (ဘာတြေံ), Kho-zar Village
2015 – 2025 Bhaddanta Tejawanta, Gat Monastery (ဘာဂါတ်), Mudon (Passed away Sept 2025, aged 104)
2025 – Present Bhaddanta Ketu Sam-hle Monastery (ဘာသာံလှေဝ်) (Appointed Dec 5, 2025)

== See also ==
- Buddhist sects in Myanmar
- Buddhism in Myanmar
