= Uyangoda =

Uyangoda (Tamil: உயன்கொட; Sinhala: උයන්ගොඩ) is a Sri Lankan surname. Notable people with the surname include:

- Jayadeva Uyangoda (born 1950), Sri Lankan political scientist and constitutional expert
- Karagoda Uyangoda Maithri Murthy Thero (born 1948), Sri Lankan Buddhist monk
- Nadeesha Uyangoda (born 1993), Sri Lankan-Italian writer, author and podcaster
