= Bhaddanta Ketu =

Buddhist monk (born 1929)

Ven. Bhaddanta Ketu Mahānāyaka Mahāthero
- ဘဒ္ဒန္တ ကေတု မဟာနာယက မဟာထေရ်
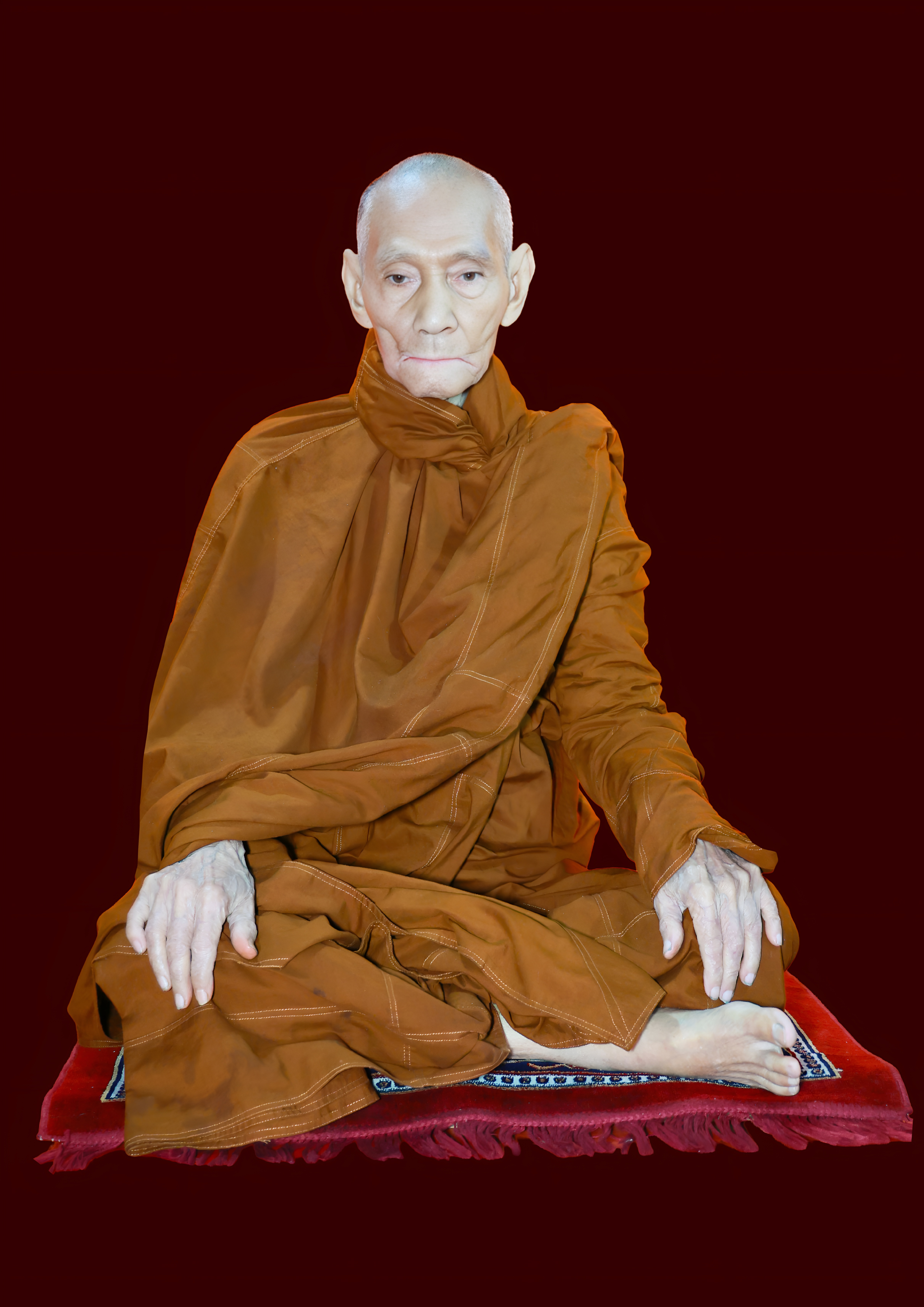
- Title: Mahānāyaka of the Rāmañña Nikāya Mon Saṅgha in Rāmaññadesa

Personal life
- Born: Mehm Poe Glaine; 16 December 1929 (age 96) Than Hle Village, Hpa-An Township, Kayin State
- Parents: Nai Saike (father); Mi Chae (mother)

Religious life
- Religion: Buddhism
- School: Theravada
- Lineage: Rāmañña Nikāya
- Dharma names: Most Ven. Bhaddanta Ketu Mahānāyaka Mahāthero

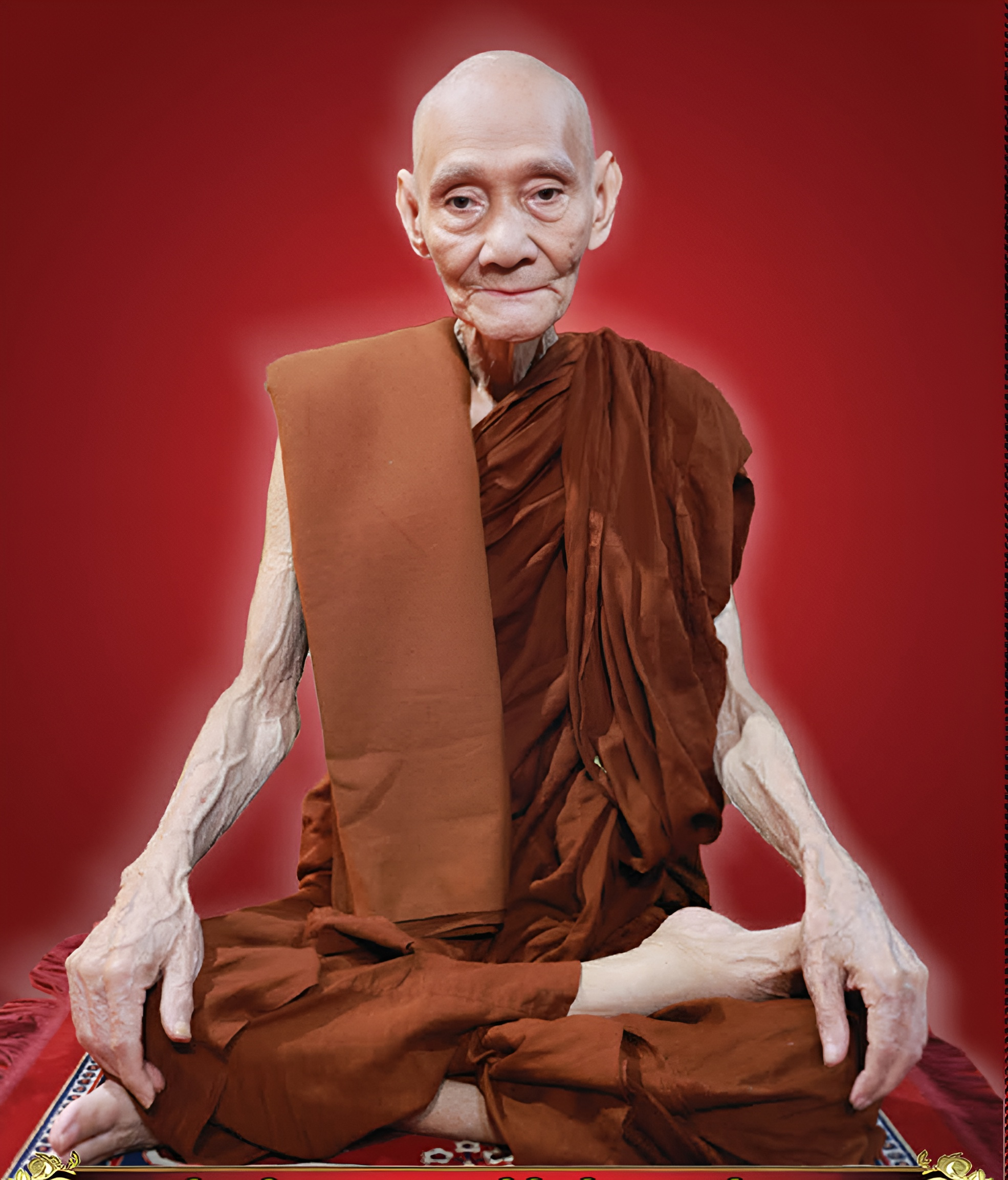

Bhaddanta Ketu Mahānāyaka Mahāthero (born 16 December 1929) is a senior Buddhist monk of the Rāmañña Nikāya within the Mon Saṅgha of southern Myanmar. He is known for his long monastic career, work in monastic education, meditation instruction, and efforts to preserve and publish Mon palm-leaf manuscripts.

He serves as a Mahānāyaka of the Rāmañña Nikāya Mon Saṅgha in Rāmaññadesa (southern Myanmar) and resides at the Rāmañña Nikāya Pariyatti Bhā Sarm Hle Monastery in Than Hle Village, Hpa-An Township, Kayin State.

== Early life ==
Bhaddanta Ketu was born on 16 December 1929 in Than Hle Village, Hpa-An Township, Kayin State, Myanmar, to Nai Saike and Mi Chae. His birth name was Mehm Poe Glaine, meaning “Massive Benefits.” He was the third of five children, with four brothers and one sister.

At the age of sixteen, in 1945, he entered the monastic order as a novice (sāmaṇera) under the name Sāmaṇera Ketu, with Bhaddanta Sobhita Mahāthero as his preceptor at the Rāmañña Nikāya Pariyatti Bhā Sarm Hle Monastery.

On 7 April 1948, at the age of twenty, he received higher ordination (upasampadā) at the Khaṅṭa Sīmā of Bhā Kyaik Suk in Mawlamyine, Mon State. His preceptor was Bhaddanta Yugandhara Mahāthero of Bhā Pran Monastery.

== Monastic education ==
After his ordination, Bhikkhu Ketu began his formal monastic studies at Bhā Kyaik Pariyatti Monastery in Paung Township, Mon State. He later continued his studies at Bhā Trim Pariyatti Monastery in Yogo Village and at Bhā Trim Monastery in Kyar-Inn Village, Mawlamyine Township.

He subsequently moved to Mandalay, where he studied at several prominent pariyatti monasteries, including:

Hongsāvatī Bhayargyi Taike

Shwe Ye Saung Taike

Nyaung Kan Taike

He spent several decades studying Buddhist scriptures. After completing the intermediate level of the Pāḷi Pathamapyan examinations, he chose to focus on scriptural study rather than further formal examinations.

== Teaching and meditation work ==
After completing his studies, Bhaddanta Ketu served as a lecturer at several pariyatti monasteries, including those where he had previously studied. He later returned to his home monastery, Sarm Hle, where he continued teaching monks and novices.

In addition to scriptural teaching, he has practised meditation for many decades and has served as a meditation instructor. He regularly delivers Dhamma talks to lay devotees and has authored meditation guidebooks.

== Publications ==
Bhaddanta Ketu has collected and published several Mon palm-leaf manuscripts, as well as his own writings. His work has focused on preserving traditional Mon Buddhist literature. He has published ten books, including two original works and eight editions based on palm-leaf manuscripts. These books have been distributed freely to monks and lay devotees.

Selected publications:

1. Vipassanā Dīpanī (Vol. 1) ဝိပဿနာဒဳပနဳ အုပ်ပထမ (1998)
2. Verses in Homage to the 28 Buddhas and Other Poems ဂါထာလ္ၚော၀်ကျာ်ြတဲ (၂၈) ကေုာံ ကဗျလၚ်္ကာတၞဟ်တၞဟ်သာ် (2003)
3. The Buddha Relics Story in a Nutshell, Chapter 7 လိက်သၠပတ်၀င်ဓာတ်ကျာ် သတ္တမဝဂ် - ရးစာသပၠင် ဗွဲခမၞောန် (2005)
4. Centennial Commemorative Book of Sarm Hle Monastery လိက်ကၞပ်စၟတ်သမ္တီ သဘင်ဘာ (သာံလှေ၀်) ပေင်ကၠံသၞာံ, (2009)
5. Core Techniques of Vipassanā and Vippatti နဲသ္ၚေဝ်ဂၠိပ်ဝိပဿနာ ကေုာံ ဝိပတ္တိ (2010)
6. Prakoh Akkharavidhana-abhidhānappadīpanī ပြကိုဟ်အက္ခရဝိဓာနအဘိဓာနပ္ပဒဳပိကာ(2015)
7. Slapot Weng Dhat, Vol. 4 သၠပတ်ဝင်ဓာတ် (လိက်ကၞပ်-၄) (2016)
8. Prakoh Lokavidū (from palm-leaf manuscript) သၠပတ်တြေံ နူသၠရိုတ် - ပြကိုဟ်လောကဝိဒူ (2017)
9. Slapot Sming Jambhupati သၠပတ်တြေံ နူသၠရိုတ် - သၠပတ်သၟီဇမ္ဗုပတိ (2019)
10. Prakoh Gran Ga-uy Phow Gatawsay Janok 10. ပြကိုဟ်ဂြန်ဂဉုဲဖျောဝ်ဂတဝ်သာဲဇၞော်ရောင် (2021)

== Religious activities ==
Bhaddanta Ketu has supported the construction of pagodas, Bodhi trees, rest houses, and monastic buildings in various parts of southern Myanmar as part of his religious activities.

== Leadership roles ==
- 12 July 2000 – Appointed abbot of Rāmañña Nikāya Pariyatti Bhā Sarm Hle Monastery
- 2017 – Selected as Mahānāyaka of the Sarm Hle Pavāraṇā Chapter
- 29 November 2024 – Inaugurated as Second Mahānāyaka of the Rāmañña Nikāya Mon Saṅgha of southern Myanmar
- 28 February 2025 – Conferred the title Rāmañña Nikāya Ukkaṭṭha Upanāyaka
- 18 November 2025 – Selected as Mahānāyaka Mahāthero of the Rāmañña Nikāya Mon Saṅgha of Rāmaññadesa
- 5 December 2025 – Conferred the title Rāmañña Nikāya Ukkaṭṭha Mahānāyaka
