= Kotugoda Dhammawasa Mahanayaka Thera =

Sri Lankan Buddhist monk (1933–2021)

Most Ven. Kotugoda Dhammawasa Thera
- පූජ්‍ය කො‍ටුගොඩ ධම්මාවාස හිමි
- Title: Most Venerable Supreme Mahanayaka Thera of Amarapura Maha Sangha Saba; Agga Maha Pandita Chief Incumbent of Sri Dharmapalaramaya, Mount Lavinia

Personal life
- Born: Sirimevan Rodrigo; 23 January 1933 Minuwangoda, British Ceylon
- Died: 22 March 2021 (aged 88) Colombo, Sri Lanka
- Parent(s): Haramanis Rodrigo (father); Selestina Rodrigo (mother)

Religious life
- Religion: Buddhism
- School: Theravada
- Lineage: Amarapura–Rāmañña Sect.
- Dharma name: Most Ven. Agga Maha Pandita Kotugoda Dhammawasa Thera

Agga Maha Pandita Kotugoda Dhammawasa Thera (Sinhala: කො‍ටුගොඩ ධම්මාවාස හිමි, romanized: Koṭugoḍa Dhammāvāsa Himi; lay name: Sirimevan Rodrigo; 23 January 1933 – 22 March 2021) was an eminent Sri Lankan Buddhist monk. He was the supreme Mahanayaka of Sri Lanka Amarapura Nikāya and was the chief incumbent of Sri Dharmapalaramaya, Mount Lavinia.

== Early life ==
He was born on January 23, 1933, in the village Kotugoda, Minuwangoda, Sri Lanka as the youngest of the family with seven siblings: five sons and two daughters. His lay name was Sirimevan Rodrigo. His father was Haramanis Rodrigo and mother was Selestina Rodrigo. He had his education from Buddhist mixed school in Kotugoda which was later known as Kotugoda Rahula Maha Vidyalaya.

Meanwhile, he was very close to village temple and its Chief Incumbent Ven. Kotugoda Pemananda Nayaka Thera. Later, he became the disciple of Ven. Unavatune Dhammapala Thera, who was the Chief Incumbent of Sri Dharmapalaramaya in Mount Lavinia. Then he was ordained on August 17, 1948, at the age of 15 and became Kotugoda Dhammawasa novice. In 1952, he attended the Paramadhammacetiya Pirivena in Ratmalana and later joined the Vidyodaya Maha Pirivena in Maligakanda. During his life at Vidyodaya, he deeply studied Tripitakas in Pali and Sanskrit.

== Religious service ==
His religious work grew when he associated with several notable Buddhist chiefs such as Most Ven. Kalukondayave Pannasekara Nayaka Thera, Most Ven. Welivitiye Sorata Nayaka Thera, Most Ven. Walane Sitthissara Thera, Most Ven. Paravahara Vajiranana Nayaka Thera. Under the guidance of Ven. Narada Thera and Ven. Piyadassi Thera, Dhammawasa Thera started his missionary activities. On July 10, 1954, he received Higher Ordination at the Udakkukhepa Seemamalakaya, where Most Ven. Beruwala Siri Sumangala Sirinivasa Mahanayaka Thera served as the 'Uppajjhaya' and Most Ven. Ambalangoda Dhammakusala Mahanayaka Thera, Most Ven. Moratuwe Sasanaratana Anunayaka Thera and Most Ven. Moratuwe Pemaratana Thera served as the 'Kammacariyas'.

After Higher Ordination, he became a prolific author and published more than 36 books on various subjects related to Buddhism since the 1960s including: Nivanata Maga, Ketumati Rajadhaniya, Kosala Raju Dutu Sihina, Dhammo Have Rakkhati Dhammacari. He also established the Bauddhodaya Association at Sri Dharmapalaramaya, Mount Lavinia to boost his literacy work. Then he started to publish a 'Vesak Annual'. He held various posts within the Amarapura Nikaya, including: his appointment in 1970 as an ordained member of the Working Committee and to the Post of Honorary Prelate (Maha Nayaka). In 1981 he became the Chief Ecclesiastical Sangha Nayaka and in 1990 as the Deputy Chief (Anunayaka) of the Amarapura Nikaya and was elected the Secretary (Lekhakadhikari). In 1980, he was appointed Amarapura Co-Secretary (Sama Lekhakadhikari) and in 1992, he became Chief Secretary (Maha Lekhakadhikari). In the meantime, he became the pioneering figure to achieve Sanghadhikarana Panatha (Ecclesiastical Act) which was drafted and approved.

On 3 October 2008, he was appointed to the post of chairman. Meanwhile, he devoted his time to the dissemination of Dhamma in foreign countries, both Asia and the West, such as India, Nepal, China, Japan, Myanmar, Bhutan, Germany, the United Kingdom and America. He was conferred with the "Aggamahapandita" title by the Burmese government on March 2, 2007, at Swarnaguha Hall, Myanmar. On December 17, 2016, Kotugoda Dhammavasa Anunayaka Thera became the Mahanayaka of the Amarapura Nikaya. On 26 May 2017, came the ecclesiastical appointment as supreme Mahanayaka Thera of the Amarapura Nikaya following the demise of Most Venerable Agga Maha Panditha Davuldena Gnanissara Thera.

== Late life and death ==
His health gradually deteriorated since mid 2020, where the religious ceremony was held on 30 September 2020 in Dharmapalarama Vihara, Mount Lavinia led by Maha Nayaka of the Amarapura Chulagandhi sect Ven. Ganthune Assaji Thera, Maha Nayaka of the Amarapura Sri Sambudhdha Shashanodaya chapter Ven. Waskaduwe Mahindhawansha Thera, Maha Nayaka of the Amarapura Dharmarakshitha Chapter, Ven. Thirikunamalaye Ananda Thera, Registrar of the Amarapura Sanga Sabha Ven. Pallekande Rathanasara Thera and Maha Sanga. Also, Bodhi Pooja which was organised by the Sri Lanka Civil Defense Force conducted by Wichithra Dharma Kathika Ven. Gampaha Mahanama Thera.

Kotugoda Dhammawasa Thera died on March 22, 2021, in Colombo private hospital, Colombo at the age of 88. The funeral rites were held at the Dharmapalaramaya temple in Mount Lavinia. The funeral procession moved from Mount Lavinia up to Independence Square in Colombo via Galle Road. The funeral took place on 25 March 2021, and the day was declared as a national mourning.

Buddhist titles
Preceded by Davuldena Gnanissara Thera	Supreme Mahanayaka of Amarapura Nikaya; 2017 - 2021	Succeeded by Dodampahala Chandrasiri Thera
