= George Duggan (priest) =

New Zealand Catholic priest and philosopher (1912–2012)

George Henry Christen Duggan (3 July 1912 – 16 December 2012) was a New Zealand Marist priest, philosopher, seminary professor and writer.

He was popularly known as Chalky Duggan - after a featherweight boxer who fought in 1919, when Duggan was 7 years old, under the name "Chalky Duggan" and who, like Duggan, came from Runanga

== Early life ==
He was born in Runanga and was educated by the Marist Brothers in Greymouth and by the Sisters of Mercy in Reefton. He received his secondary education from the Marist fathers at St Bede's College, Christchurch, of which he was dux two years in a row. Duggan then went to Greenmeadows Seminary in Hawkes Bay in Hawke's Bay, where he was professed as a member of the Marist order on 4 February 1931, the day after the 1931 Hawke's Bay earthquake.

== Training ==
In 1933 Duggan was sent to Rome to continue his theological studies. He was an alumnus of the Pontifical University of St Thomas Aquinas (the Angelicum) of the Dominicans. He was ordained a Catholic priest in Rome on 7 March 1936, the feast day of St Thomas Aquinas. In 1937, he completed his theology studies. His doctoral thesis was on The Church in the Writing of St John Fisher.

== Academic career and contribution ==
In 1938 Duggan returned to New Zealand and joined the seminary staff at Mount St Mary's, Greenmeadows to teach philosophy to aspirant Marists. His lifelong philosophic position was his dedication to Thomistic philosophy which he stated was, "the one philosophy that can integrate the wisdom of the past with the facts of modern science". He published several books and also worked in various colleges and parishes throughout New Zealand.

He achieved public fame through his books and, especially after his retirement from teaching and from priestly ministry, for his numerous letters to the editor in newspaper and journal columns to defend the traditional position of the Catholic Church in relation to many issues. A Wellington journalist one described Duggan as "chief among the divine publicists".

== Bibliography ==
- Evolution and Philosophy, AH & AW Reed, Wellington, 1949.
- Hans Kung and Reunion, Mercier Press, 1964.
- Teilhardism and the Faith, 1969.

== See also ==
- "Feature: George Duggan – the man the myth", Society of Mary New Zealand, 3 July 2012 (Retrieved 17 December 2014) - a detailed biography, including a discussion of the philosophic positions of George Duggan.
- Bernard O'Brien (Jesuit) - New Zealand seminary professor contemporary of Duggan's - who had a very different emphasis.
- List of centenarians (religious figures)
- Marist Seminary
- Society of Mary (Marists)
- Roman Catholicism in New Zealand
