= Narada Maha Thera =

Sri Lankan Theravada Buddhist monk and scholar

Narada Mahathera
- නාරද මහා ස්ථවිරයන් වහන්සේ
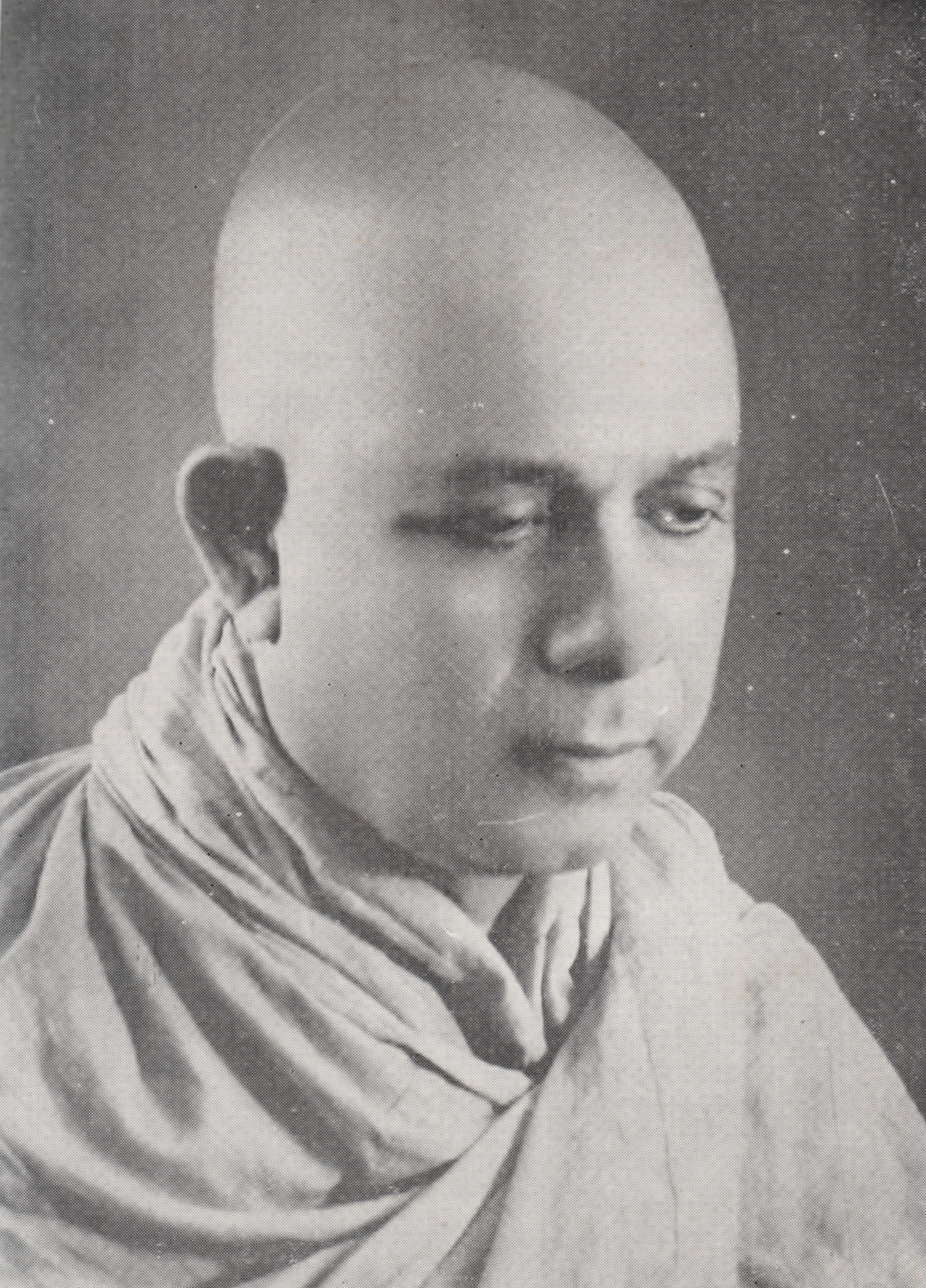
- Mahathera, c. 1920s
- Title: Mahathera

Personal life
- Born: July 14, 1898 Kotahena, Colombo, Sri Lanka
- Died: October 2, 1983 (aged 85)
- Education: St. Benedict's College, Colombo

Religious life
- Religion: Buddhism
- School: Theravada
- Lineage: Amarapura Nikaya
- Dharma name: Narada

Narada Maha Thera (Sinhala: නාරද මහා ස්ථවිරයන් වහන්සේ), born Sumanapala Perera (14 July 1898 – 2 October 1983) was a Theravada Buddhist monk, scholar, translator, educator and Buddhist missionary who was for many years the Superior of Vajiraramaya in Colombo, Sri Lanka. He was a popular figure in his native country, Sri Lanka, and beyond.

== Biography ==
He was born in Kotahena, Colombo to a middle class family, educated at St. Benedict's College and Ceylon University College, and ordained at the age of eighteen.

In 1929 he represented Sri Lanka at the opening ceremony for the new Mulagandhakuti vihara at Sarnath, India, and in 1934 he visited Indonesia, the first Theravadan monk to do so in more than 450 years. During this opportunity, he planted and blessed a Bodhi tree on the southeastern side of Borobudur on 10 March 1934, and some local laypeople were initiated as upāsakas and upāsikās. Later, during the Vesak celebration in 1959, he ordained several upāsakas as sāmaṇeras (novice monks). From that point on he travelled to many countries to conduct missionary work: Taiwan, Cambodia, Laos, South Vietnam, Singapore, Japan, Nepal, and Australia. In 1956, he visited the United Kingdom and the United States, and addressed a huge crowd at the Washington Monument. On 2 November 1960, Narada Maha Thera brought a bodhi tree to the South Vietnamese temple Thích Ca Phật Đài, and made many visits to the country during the 1960s.

Along with others (such as Piyadassi Maha Thera) he contributed to the popularisation of the bana style Dhamma talk in the 1960s and brought the Buddhist teachings "to the day-to-day lives of the Westernized middle class in Sri Lanka".

== Bibliography ==
- The Buddha and His Teachings Fourth Edition: Buddhist Missionary Society, Kuala Lumpur, Malaysia, 1988. ISBN 9679-92044-5
- Buddhism in a Nutshell
- The Buddhist Doctrine of Kamma and Rebirth
- Kandaraka Sutta; Potaliya Sutta: Discourses from the Majjhima Nikaya
- Apannaka Sutta, Cula Malunkya Sutta, Upali Sutta: Discourses from the Majjhima Nikaya
- Manual of Abhidhamma
- An Elementary Pali Course
- Life of Venerable Sariputta
- Everyman’s Ethics
- Facts of Life
- Dhammapada, Pali text and translation
- The Way to Nibbana
- Mirror of the Dhamma: A Manual of Buddhist Chanting and Devotional Texts
- An Outline of Buddhism
- The Life of Buddha, In His Own Words
