= Piyadassi Maha Thera =

Sri Lankan Buddhist monk (1914–1998)

- පියදස්සි මහා ස්ථවිරයන් වහන්සේ
- Title: Chief Incumbent of the Vajiraramaya Temple Bambalapitiya

Personal life
- Born: 8 July 1914 Kotahena, Colombo, Sri Lanka
- Died: 18 August 1998 (aged 84)
- Education: Nalanda College; University of Sri Lanka; Harvard University

Religious life
- Religion: Buddhism
- School: Theravāda
- Lineage: Amarapura Nikaya

Senior posting
- Teacher: Palane Vajiragnana Thera

Piyadassi Maha Thera (Sinhala: පියදස්සි මහා ස්ථවිරයන් වහන්සේ, 8 July 1914 – 18 August 1998) was a Theravādin Buddhist monk and preacher of the Dharma, both in Sinhalese and in English. He was born on 8 July 1914 at Kotahena in Colombo, Sri Lanka and was educated at Nalanda College, Colombo, thereafter at the University of Sri Lanka and the Center for the Study of World Religions at Harvard University as a research student.

At the age of twenty, he entered the Buddhist monastic order under Pelene Siri Vajiragnana Nayaka Thera, founder of the Vajirarama Bambalapitiya. Later, he received his higher ordination under the tutorship of Vajiranna, founding superior of the Vajirarama Colombo.

Piyadassi Maha Thera was the Sinhala editor at the Buddhist Publication Society until his death. Along with Nyanaponika Thera, he was one of the chief kalyāṇamitta of American Buddhist scholar and monk Bhikkhu Bodhi.

Venerable Piyadassi Maha Thera lived to the age of 84 years and died on 18 August 1998.

== Literature ==
- Piyadassi Thera – The Buddha's Ancient Path
- Piyadassi Thera – The Book of Protection – Paritta
- Piyadassi Thera – Buddhism: A Living Message
- A Felicitation Volume Presented to THE VEN. NĀRADA MAHATHERA. 1979. Edited by Piyadassi Thera.

=== Wheel Publications (BPS) ===
- The Seven Factors Of Enlightenment: Satta Bojjhanga (WH001)
- Buddha—His Life and Teaching (WH005)
- Dependent Origination: Paticca-samuppada (WH015)
- Lamp of the Law (WH038) (co-authored with Soma Thera)
- Psychological Aspect of Buddhism (WH179)

=== Bodhi Leaf Publications (BPS) ===
- Four Sacred Shrines (BL08)
- Aspects of Buddhism (BL21)
- Buddhist Observances and Practices (BL48)
- The Story of Mahinda, Saṅghamittā and the Sri Mahā-Bodhi (BL57)
- The Elimination of Anger (BL68)
- Selections From the Dhammapada: Sayings of the Buddha
- The Threefold Division of the Noble Eightfold Path (BL32)
