= Makulawe Wimala Thera =

Sri Lankan Buddhist monk

Ven. Makulawe Wimala Thera
- Title: Mahanayaka of Sri Lanka Ramanna Nikaya

Personal life
- Born: 25 August 1948 (age 77)

Religious life
- Religion: Buddhism
- School: Theravada
- Lineage: Rāmañña Nikāya
- Dharma names: Most Venerable Aggamaha Panditha Makulawe Wimala Thera

Makulawe Wimala Thera (born 25 August 1948) is a Sri Lankan Buddhist monk who is the present Mahanayaka Thera of the Sri Lanka Ramanna Nikaya. He has been appointed as the 14th Mahanayaka Thera of the Ramanna Maha Nikaya on 22 November 2020 following the demise of Most Venerable Napane Pemasiri Thera.

Buddhist titles
Preceded by Napana Pemasiri Thera	Mahanayaka of Sri Lanka Ramanna Nikaya; 2020 - present	Succeeded by TBA
