= Davuldena Gnanissara Thera =

Sri Lankan monk and religious leader

Most Venerable Davuldena Gnanissara, 2nd Supreme Mahanayaka Thero of Sri Lanka
- දවුල්දෙන ඤාණිස්සර, II වන උත්තරීතර මහානායක හිමි
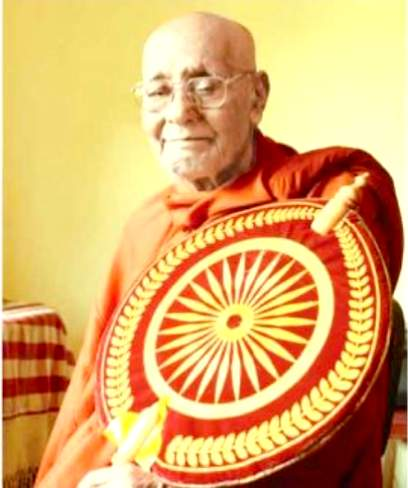
- Most Venerable Davuldena Gnanissara, 2nd Supreme Mahanayake Thero
- Title: 2nd Supreme Mahanayaka Thero of Sri Lanka, for the Amarapura Maha Sangha Sabha

Personal life
- Born: Kiribaddana Mudiyanse; 31 December 1915 Davuldena,Uva Paranagama, Monaragala District, Ceylon
- Died: 22 March 2021 (aged 105)

Religious life
- Religion: Buddhism
- Temple: Sri Vidya Vijayaramaya, Pagoda
- Order: Udarata Amarapura Chapter Samagri Sangha Council
- School: Theravada
- Lineage: Amarapura Maha Sangha Council

Senior posting
- Predecessor: Most Venerable Madihe Pannaseeha Thera (1st Supreme Mahanayake Thero)
- Successor: Most Venerable Kotugoda Dhammawasa Thera (3rd Supreme Mahanayake Thero)

Styles of Most Venerable Davuldena Gnanissara, 2nd Supreme Mahanayake Thero
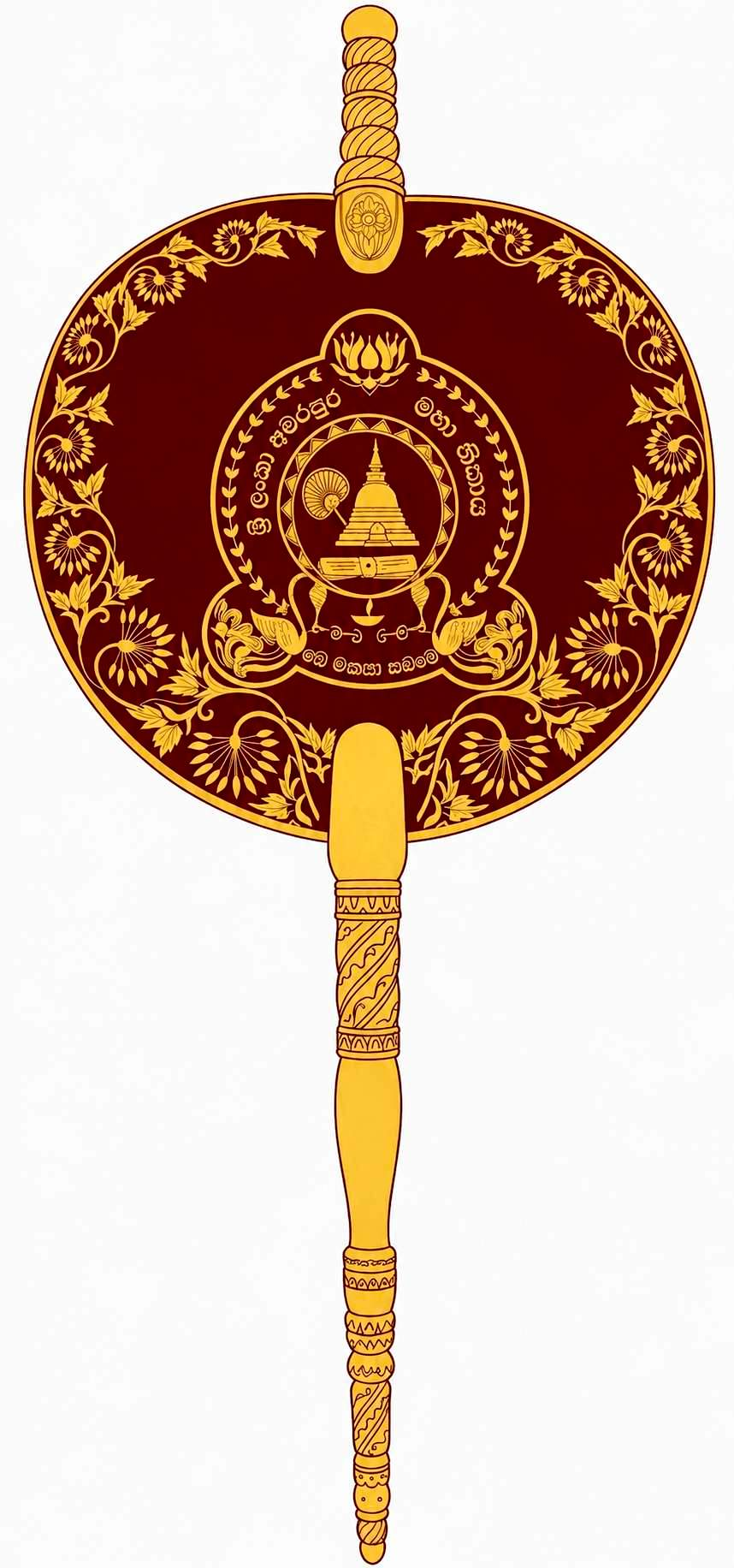
- Reference style: The Most Venerable
- Spoken style: Supreme Mahanayaka Thero of Sri Lanka
- Alternative style: Maha Sthavira

Agga Maha Pandita Davuldena Sri Gnanissara Thera (31 December 1915 in Badulla District – 3 April 2017) was a Sri Lankan scholar Buddhist monk and a centenarian. He served as the supreme Mahanayaka of the Sri Lanka Amarapura Nikaya from 2002 until his death on 3 April 2017. Thera has also authored several books and was proficient in Pali, Sanskrit and English Languages. Born on 31 December 1915 at Dawuldena in Badulla District, he entered the order of Buddhist monks under the guidance of Venerable Umele Pagnananda and Venerable Umele Piyarathana Nayake Theras in 1928. He was appointed to the Mahanayaka post of Amarapura Nikaya in 2002 and was 101 years old at the time of his death.

Buddhist titles
Preceded by Madihe Pannaseeha Thera	Supreme Mahanayaka Thero of Sri Lanka, for the Amarapuara Maha Sangha Council; 2002 - 2017	Succeeded by Kotugoda Dhammawasa Thera
