= Madihe Pannaseeha Thero =

Sri Lankan Buddhist monk (1913-2003)

Most Venerable Madihe Pannasiha, 1st Supreme Mahanayaka Thero of Sri Lanka
- මඩිහේ පඤ්ඤාසීහ; I වන උත්තරීතර මහානායක හිමි
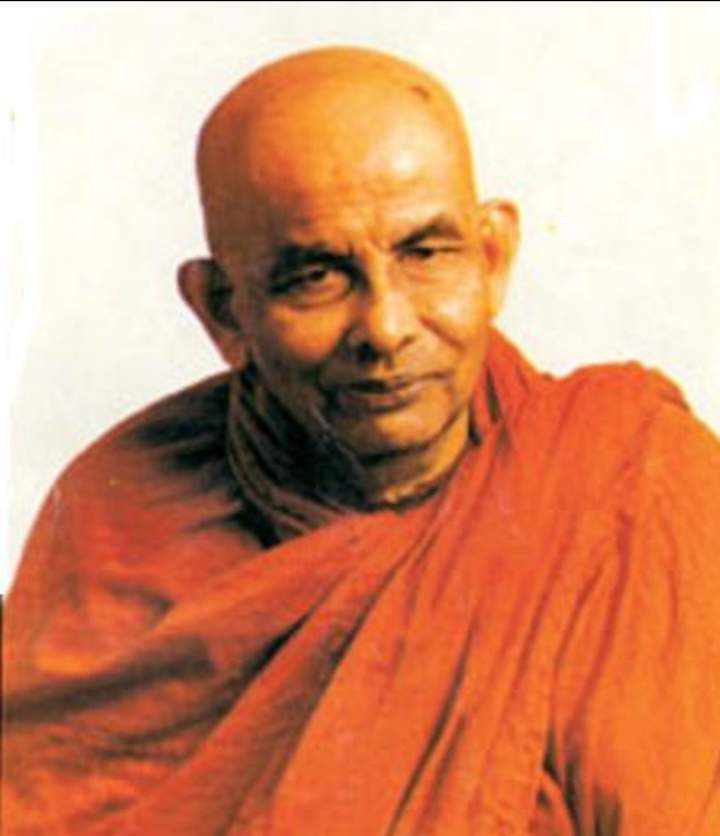
- Most Venerable Madihe Pannasiha, 1st Supreme Mahanayaka Thero
- Title: 1st Supreme Mahanayaka Thero of Sri Lanka,for the Amarapura Maha Sangha Sabha

Personal life
- Born: Benson Wilmot; 21 June 1913 Matara, Ceylon
- Died: 9 September 2003 (aged 90)

Religious life
- Religion: Buddhism
- Temple: Vajiragnana Bhikshu Training Institute, Maharagama
- Order: Amarapura Dharmarakshitavamsa Chapter
- School: Theravada
- Lineage: Amarapura Maha Sangha Council

Senior posting
- Predecessor: Inaugural holder
- Successor: Most Venerable Davuldena Gnanissara Thera (2nd Supreme Mahanayaka Thero)

Madihe Pannaseeha Thero

1st Supreme Mahanayaka Thero of the Amarapura Maha Sangha Sabha
- In office 13 July 1969 – 9 September 2003

Mahanayaka Thero of the Amarapura Dharmarakshitavamsa Chapter
- In office 27 November 1955 – 9 September 2003

Styles of Most Venerable Madihe Pannasiha, 1st Supreme Mahanayake Thero
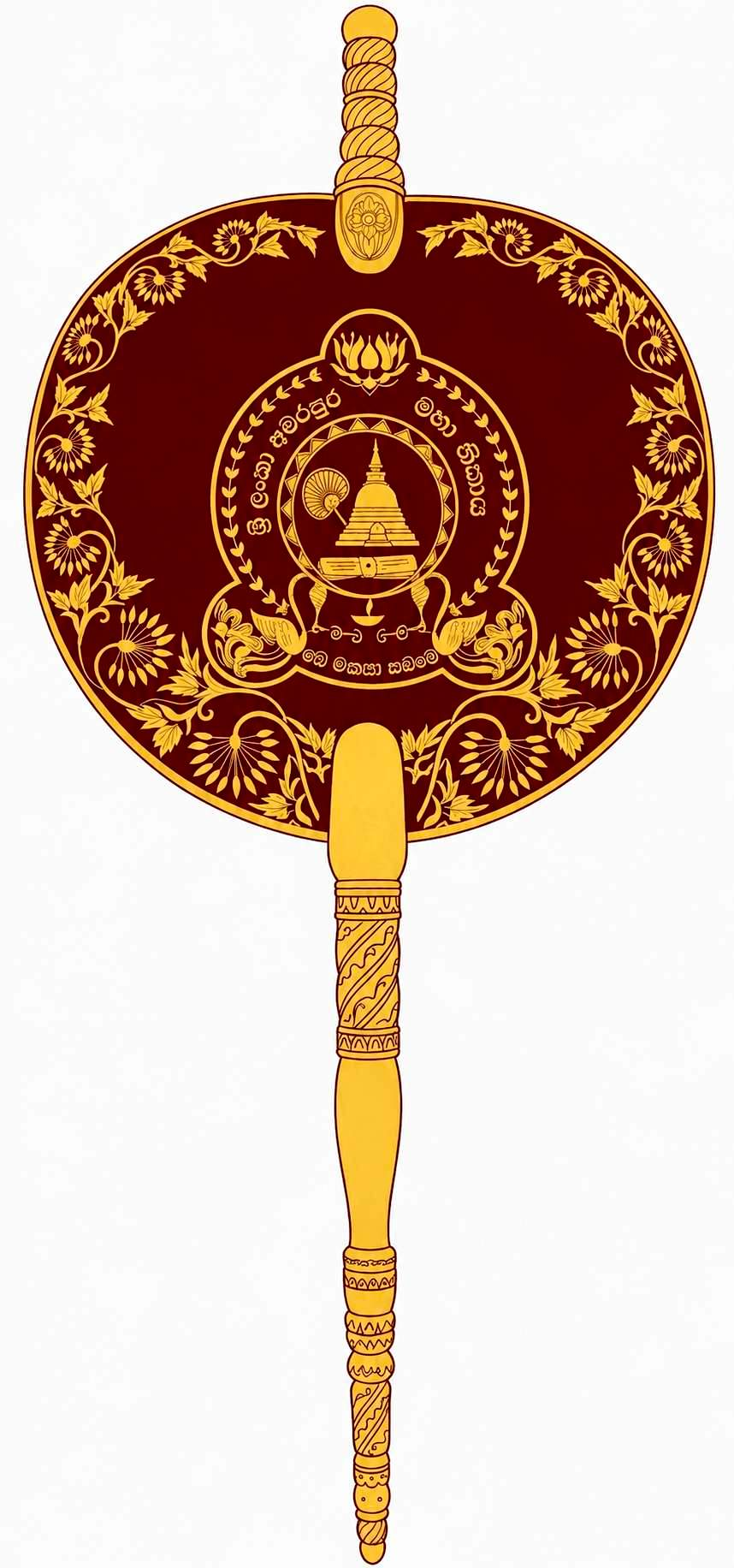
- Reference style: The Most Venerable
- Spoken style: Supreme Mahanayaka Thero of Sri Lanka
- Alternative style: Maha Sthavira

Most Venerable Madihe Pannaseeha Mahathera (Pali: Paññāsīha) (June 21, 1913 – September 9, 2003) was an eminent Sri Lankan Buddhist monk, who was the Mahanayaka of Amarapura sect from July 13, 1969, until his death on September 9, 2003.

== Early life ==
Madihe Pannaseeha Nayaka Thera was born on June 21, 1913, in Madihe village in Matara district, as the youngest in a family of five. His lay name was Benson Wilmot. Benson Wilmot had his education in the English medium at St. Thomas' College, Matara and later at Mahinda College, Galle. At the age of 13 he entered the Buddhist Order. His ordination was held at Devagiri Vihara, Kabmurugamuwa, on June 24, 1926. He was named 'Madihe Pannasheeha' at the ordination.

== Elected Maha Nayaka ==
An election by secret vote was held on November 27, 1955, at Vajiraramaya, Bambalapitiya, to select the Maha Nayaka (Great Chief) Thera to succeed Ven. Palane Vagiragnana Nayake Thera. At the election 141 Bhikkus of the Nikaya cast their votes, and Ven. Madihe Pannasiha received 109 votes, while the other contender received the remaining 32 votes. Accordingly, Ven. Madihe Pannasiha was elected as the Maha Nayaka Thera of the Amarapura Sri Dharmarakkhita Nikaya by a clear majority vote.

The certificate for the appointment of Maha Nayaka was handed over at Vajiraramaya Bambalapitiya, in the presence of a very large gathering of Nayaka Theras in Siam, Amarapura and Ramanna Nikayas.

A few days after the appointment, Sir Cyril de Zoysa and R. Premadasa, the late President, an MMC Colombo at that time had called on the Maha Nayaka Thera individually and after conferring his good wishes had made a request which has come to effect and that was to incorporate all sects of the Amarapura Nikaya into one. The first Vinaya Karma was held at Maharagama on July 13, 1969. It not only united the Nikaya, but also made him the head of the United Amarapura Nikaya.

== Buddhist committees ==
In April 1954 a committee was appointed by the all Ceylon Buddhist Congress composed of members from Buddhist clergy and laity in order to ascertain salient facts about the conditions and ways of Buddhist life. Ven. Madihe Pannasiha Thera was among the members of that committee which issued its report on February 4, 1956.

Sir Oliver Goonetilake, the Governor-General appointed a Buddha Sasana Commission on March 4, 1957, under the chairmanship of Ven. Kalukondayawe Pangnasekera Maha Nayaka Thera and Ven. Madihe Pannasiha was also a member of that Commission, which issued its report after visiting Buddhist countries abroad. After this report was issued, Ven. Madihe Pannasiha Maha Nayaka Thera took up the issues such as taking over all assisted schools to the government and making all Poya days public holidays.

== Propagation of Buddhism ==
Maha Nayaka Thera visited China in 1946 for the propagation of Theravada Buddhism. Thera also visited Kathmandu in Nepal for a higher ordination of Bhikkhus in 1951 and in 1954 to establish a Seema Malaka in Lalith Pura, Nepal and he renamed the Buddhist Vihara there from "Young Sumangala Vihara" to "Sri Sumangala Vihara".

Ven. Thera visited Burma on January 4, 1954, and attended the Sixth Buddhist council, and in 1956 during the 2500 Buddha Jayantiya he took part in the establishment of a Seema Malaka.

Maha Nayaka Thera left for America on 27 March 1964 on an invitation from the Asia Foundation to gain an idea of the educational training prevailing there, ways and means of rural development, and also for the propagation of Theravada Buddhism in America. He spent 5 months there and made arrangements to establish a Vihara in Washington in 1964. Other places of his visit were England, West Indies, Scotland, Denmark, France, Italy, Germany, Japan, Vietnam, Hong Kong and Singapore. On his return he established the Buddhist Information Centre at Greenpath, Colombo, the first of its kind in order to furnish information to any one who is interested in Buddhism. The World Buddhist Directory is published by this Information Center.

== Social services ==
=== Thurunu Saviya ===
After returning from USA, Maha Nayaka Thera organised the "Thurunu Saviya" at Maharagama to organise and train the youths of Sri Lanka. Maha Nayaka Thera considered that the young generation in Sri Lanka should be directed in the correct lines. This movement attracted many youths and this resulted in a society called "Samma Ajeeva Sangamaya" in 1974. This was necessary to counter the increasing rate of drug addiction and alcoholism among the youths of Sri Lanka. Ven. Maha Nayaka Thera played an important role in the rehabilitation of youths after the 1971 Insurrection.thurunu saviya has 10 groups for train the young. Madihe Pannaseeha Thera wanted to provide and develop society."Thurunu Saviya" organisation help full to provide leadership qualities and time management, economic management etc.

=== Dharma Vijaya foundation ===
The Dharma Vijaya Foundation established in 1979 under the patronage of the Maha Nayaka Thera has noble objectives to make Sri Lanka a Dharma Deepa or a country where righteous people live, to develop the economy and the culture of the country simultaneously and also to serve the poor in their social needs and education.

=== Temperance movement ===
He succeeded Ven. Kalukondayawe Pangnasekera Maha Nayaka Thera as the president of the Sri Lanka Temperance Movement, to carry out the good work commenced during the early part of the 20th century.

== Honours and death ==
Thera was conferred an honorary Ph.D. from the University of Peradeniya in 1987, and received the honorific title Agga Maha Pandita from Burma in the year 1996. Thera died on September 9, 2003, at the age of 90.

Buddhist titles
Preceded by N/A	Supreme Mahanayaka Thero of Sri Lanka, for the Amarapura Maha Sangha Council; 1969 - 2002	Succeeded by Davuldena Gnanissara Thera
