= Karagoda Uyangoda Maithri Murthy Thera =

Sri Lankan Buddhist monk

Most Venerable Karagoda Uyangoda Maithri Murthy the 5th Supreme Mahanayaka Thero
- කරගොඩ උයන්ගොඩ මෛත්‍රීමූර්ති V වන උත්තරීතර මහානායක හිමි
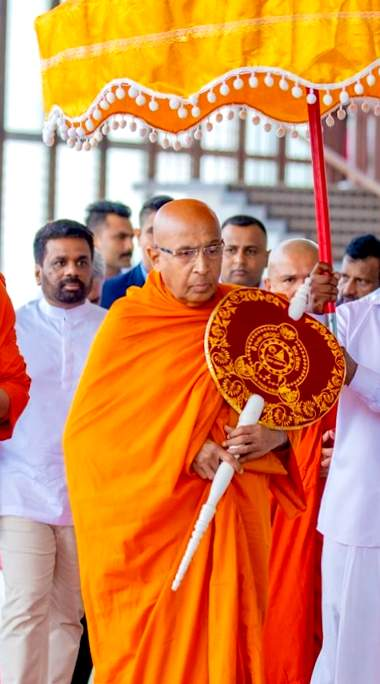
- Most Venerable Karagoda Uyangoda Maithri Murthy Thera,5th Supreme Mahanayaka Thero
- Title: 5th Supreme Mahanayaka Thero of Sri Lanka for the Amarapura Maha Sangha Council

Personal life
- Born: Jayasena Veeraman Abeywickrama; 1 October 1948 (age 77) Kamburugamuwa, Matara District, Ceylon (now Sri Lanka)

Religious life
- Religion: Buddhism
- Temple: Sri Dharmananda Vidyayathana Pirivena, Balangoda
- Order: Amarapura Rassagala Chapter
- School: Theravada
- Lineage: Amarapura Maha Sangha Council

Senior posting
- Predecessor: Most Venerable; Dodampahala Chandrasiri Thera (4th Supreme Mahanayake Thero)
- Successor: Incumbent

Styles of Most Venerable Karagoda Uyangoda Maithri Murthy, 5th Supreme Mahanayake Thero
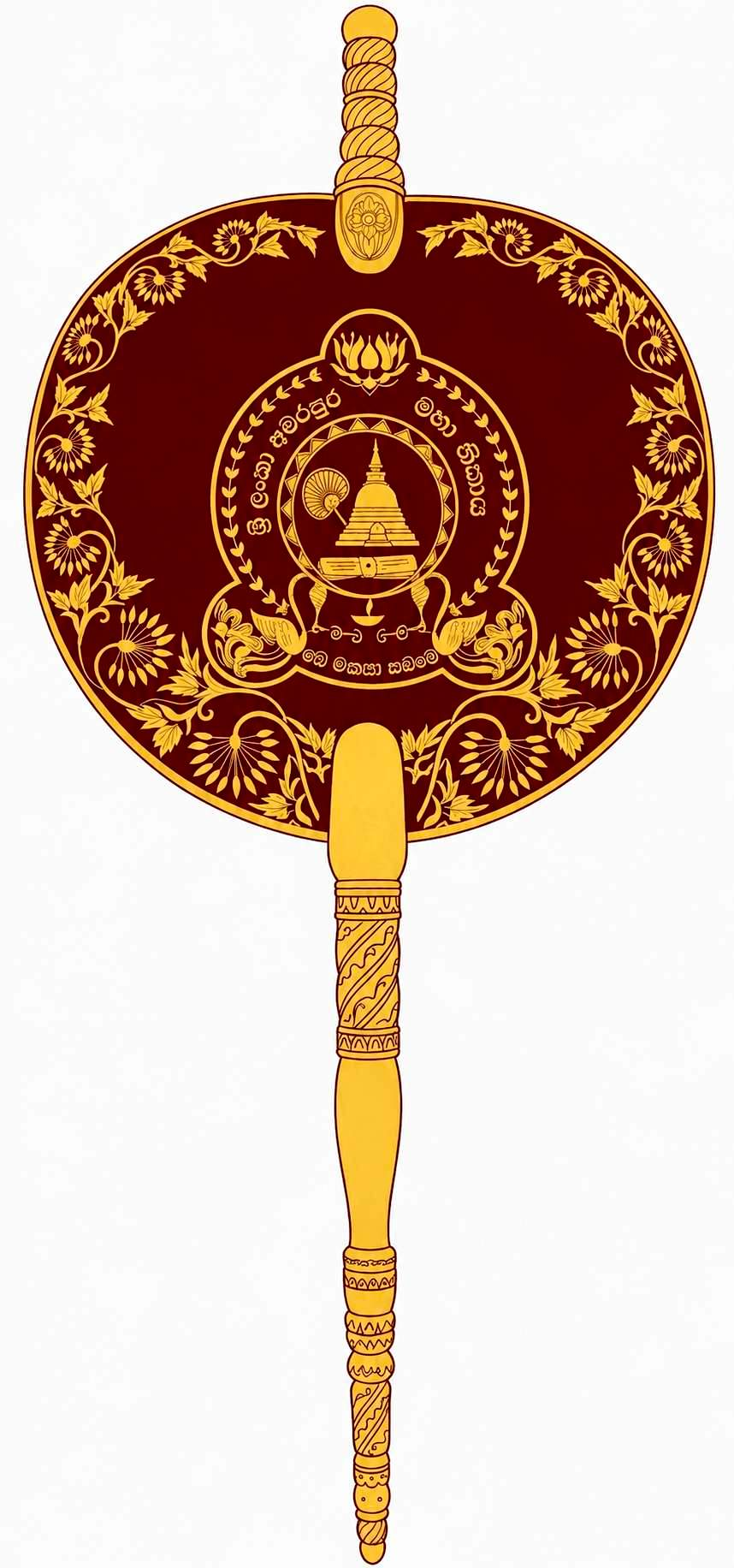
- Reference style: The Most Venerable
- Spoken style: Supreme Mahanayake Thero of Sri Lanka
- Alternative style: Maha Sthavira

Karagoda Uyangoda Maithri Murthy Thera (born 1 October 1948) is a Sri Lankan Buddhist monk who is the present Mahanayaka Thera of the Sri Lanka Amarapura Nikāya. He has been appointed as the 5th supreme Mahanayaka Thera of Sri Lanka Amarapura Nikaya on 10 March 2025. Sri Lankan President Anura Dissanayake presented him with the Sannas Pathra in a formal ceremony held in Colombo.

He was the chief incumbent of the Balangoda Sri Dharmananda Vidyayathana Pirivena and the Mahanayake of the Rassagala Vihara Parsava of Amarapura Nikaya, before being appointed as the Mahanayaka of Amarapura Maha Sangha Sabha. Karagoda Uyangoda Maithri Murthy Mahanayaka Thera was born on 1 October 1948, in Kamburupitiya, Matara District, and entered the monastic life in 1962 under the guidance of Balangoda Ananda Maitreya Thera.

Buddhist titles
Preceded by Dodampahala Chandrasiri Thera	Supreme Mahanayaka Thero of Sri Lanka for the Amarapura Maha Sangha Council; 2024 - present	Succeeded by TBA
