= Weweldeniye Medhalankara Thera =

The Most Venerable Wewaldeniye Medhalankara Thera අතිපූජ්‍යය වේවැල්දෙණියේ මේධාලංකාර මහා ථේර
- Title: Sasanasobhana, Sri Saddhammavacissaracariya, Sarannkaropasenavansavatansa, Aggamahasadddhammajotikadhaja, Sahityashuri, 12th Maha Nayaka Thera (Ramanna Nikaya), The Chief Incumbent of the Shasanawardhana Pirivena, Mirigama

Personal life
- Born: 7 December 1909 Millawala, Wewaldeniya (Sri Lanka)
- Died: 30 August 2012 (aged 102) Colombo (Sri Lanka)
- Education: Vidyananda Maha Pirivena, Nittambuwa

Religious life
- Religion: Buddhism
- School: Theravada
- Lineage: Ramanna Nikaya
- Dharma name: Medhalankara
- Ordination: 26 May 1922

Senior posting
- Teacher: Ven. Kathaluwe Seelawansa Thera and Ven. Kadiragama Sumanasara Thera

The Most Venerable Wewaldeniye Medhalankara Thera (Sinhala: අතිපූජ්‍යය වේවැල්දෙණියේ මේධාලංකාර මහා ථේර) (7 December 1909 – 30 August 2012) was a Sri Lankan Buddhist monk who was the 12th Maha Nayaka of Ramanna Nikaya and the chief incumbent of the Shasanawardhana Pirivena, Mirigama. Following his demise, he was succeeded by Most Ven. Napane Pemasiri Thera as the Maha Nayaka of Ramanna Nikaya.

== See also ==
- Sri Lankan Buddhism
