= Rāmañña Nikāya =

Sri Lankan Buddhist monastic order, originated from Myanmar

- රාමඤ්ඤ නිකාය
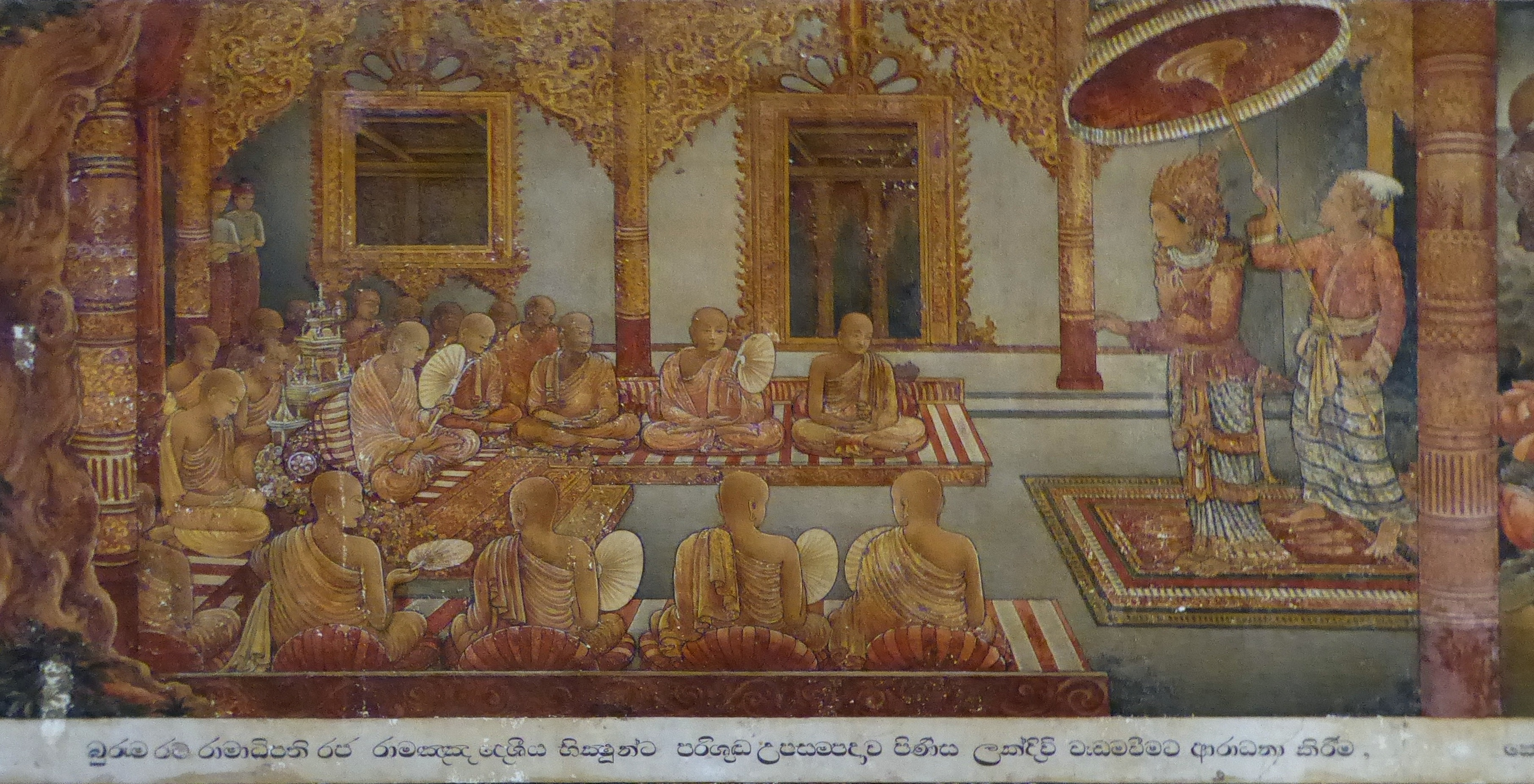
- The King of Burma Inviting the Ramañña Monks to get Ordination in Sri Lanka
- Merged into: Amarapura–Rāmañña Nikāya
- Formation: 1864
- Dissolved: August 16, 2019; 6 years ago
- Type: Monastic order
- Headquarters: Mula Maha Vihara, Payagala, Kalutara, Sri Lanka
- Origins: Rāmañña Nikāya (Myanmar)
- Region served: Sri Lanka
- Leader: Makulǣva Vimala Thera
- Key people: Most Ven. Ambagahawatte Indrasabhawara Gnanasami Maha Thera (Founder)

Rāmañña Nikāya (රාමඤ්ඤ නිකාය, also spelled Ramanya Nikaya) was one of the three major Buddhist orders in Sri Lanka. It was founded in 1864 when Ambagahawatte Saranankara, returned to Sri Lanka after being ordained by the Neyyadhamma Munivara Sangharaja of Ratnapunna Vihara in Burma. It was one of three Sri Lankan orthodox Buddhist monastic orders, along with Siam Nikaya and Amarapura Nikaya. On 16 August 2019, the Amarapura and Rammana Nikaya were unified as the Amarapura–Rāmañña Nikāya, making it the largest Buddhist fraternity in Sri Lanka.

== Similar orders ==
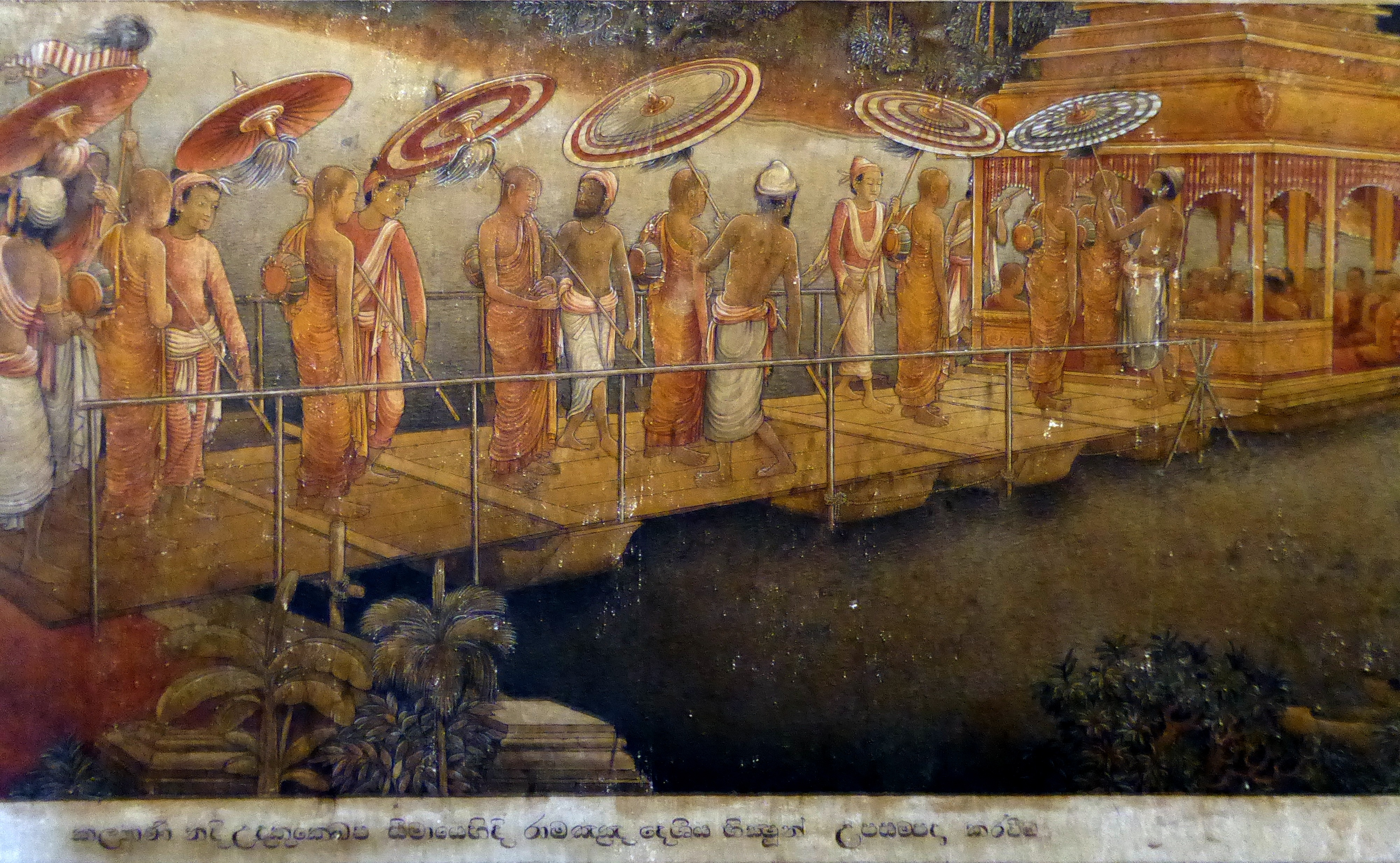
Ordination of Ramañña Monks in Kelani Water Sima

Rāmañña Nikāya was said to be similar to the Thammayut Nikaya order of Thailand. Rāmañña Nikāya is currently surviving in Thailand, Burma and Sri Lanka.

The Most Ven. Napana Premasiri Thera was appointed the Head of the Rāmañña Nikāya on 3 September 2012 following the demise of Venenerable Weweldeniye Medhalankara Thera aged 103.

Rāmañña Nikāya was established on 12 June 1864 in participation with Ven. Ambagahawatte Indaasabhawara Gaanasaami Maha Thera, Ven. Puwakdandawe Paññānanda, Ven. Warāpitiye Sumitta Thera.

First Maha Nayaka Thera – Most Ven. Ambagahawatte Indrasabhawara Gnanasami Maha Thera. Main Station – Mūla Maha Viharaya, Payagala, Kalutara.

== Ascetic Tendency ==
In the beginning, the majority of monasteries of Rāmañña Nikāya were forest monasteries. Although many village temples have emerged in modern days, the forest tradition is still being continued by Śrī Kalyāṇī Yogāśrama Saṃsthā of Rāmañña Nikāya which is the most strict forest tradition in Sri Lanka.

== Resistance to Modernisation ==
Though it has been impossible to resist completely, many old and simple traditions still survive in Rāmañña Nikāya. The monks of the Nikaya can be distinguished by the traditions such as using palm leaf umbrellas and alms bowls and covering both shoulders while traveling. "Ramanna Nikaya had its own distinctive style. They used begging bowls instead of plates. Instead of umbrellas, they used folded palmyrah leaves, in the form of “bogava”. The bogava introduced by Ven. Ambagahawatte Thera was made usable by C. B. Nugawela, chairman of the Up country Sabha for the Protection of Nikaya. They wore robes that were dyed according to the traditional rules."

== Forest Dwelling and Meditation Practice ==
Many of the well known Forest Meditation Masters and Forest Monasteries are said to be in the former Rāmañña Nikāya. Most Ven. Puwakdandawe Paññānanda Maha Thera was the pioneer of forest dwellers of Rāmañña Nikāya. Most Ven. Kadavedduve Jinavamsa Maha Thera was a well-known founder of Śrī Kalyāṇī Yogāśrama Saṃsthā the major forest sect of Rāmañña Nikāya.

Most Ven. Matara Sri Gnanarama Maha Thera, Most Ven. Matale Silarakkhita Maha Thera. Most Ven. Madawala Dhammatilaka and Most Venerable Nauyane Ariyadhamma Mahāthēra were well-known meditation masters of Rāmañña Nikāya Forest Tradition.

== Mahanayaka Theras of Rāmañña Nikāya ==
The following is a list of Mahanayaka Theras of Sri Lanka Ramanna Nikaya.

1. Ven. Ambagahawatte Indrasabhawara Gnanasami Maha Thera (1880–1886) අතිපූජ්‍ය අඹගහවත්තේ සරණංකර ඉන්ද්‍රාසභවර ඤාණසාමි මහා ථේර
2. Ven. Deepegoda Saddammawara Jothipala Seelakkandabidhana Maha Thera (1887–1916) අතිපූජ්‍ය දීපේගොඩ සද්ධම්මවර ජෝතිපාල සීලක්ඛන්ධාභිධාන මහා ථේර
3. Ven. Obadakannde Siri Vimalananda Maha Thera (1917–1924) අතිපූජ්‍ය ඕබඩකන්දේ සිරි විමලානන්දතිස්ස මහා ථේර
4. Ven. Matara Gnanindasaba Maha Thera (1924–1937) අතිපූජ්‍ය මාතර ඤාණින්දාසභ මහා ථේර
5. Ven. Kodagoda Upasenabhidhana Maha Thera (1937–1939) අතිපූජ්‍ය කෝදාගොඩ උපසේනාභිධාන මහා ථේර
6. Ven. Matale Dhammasiddhi Maha Thera (1939–1940) අතිපූජ්‍ය මාතලේ ධම්මසිද්ධි මහා ථේර
7. Ven. Karathota Siri Indasarathissa Maha Thera (1941–1954) අතිපූජ්‍ය කරතොට සිරි ඉන්දසාරතිස්ස මහා ථේර
8. Ven. Hisselle Siri Gnanodaya Maha Thera (1954–1966) අතිපූජ්‍ය හිස්සැල්ලේ සිරි ඤාණෝදය මහා ථේර
9. Ven. Deepegoda Chandavimala Maha Thera (1966–1976) අතිපූජ්‍ය දීපේගොඩ චන්දවිමල මහා ථේර
10. Ven. Induruwe Uttharanandabidhana Maha Thera (1976–1986) අතිපූජ්‍ය ඉඳුරුවේ උත්තරානන්දාභිධාන මහා ථේර
11. Ven. Pottewela Pannasara Maha Thera (1986-1997) අතිපූජ්‍ය පොත්තේවෙල පඤ්ඤාසාර මහා ථේර
12. Ven. Weweldeniye Medhalankara Thera (1998–2012) අතිපූජ්‍ය වේවැල්දෙණියේ මේධාලංකාර මහා ථේර
13. Ven. Napana Pemasiri Maha Thera (2012–2020) අතිපූජ්‍ය නාපාන පෙමසිරි මහා ථේර
14. Ven. Makulawe Wimala Thera (2020–present) අතිපූජ්‍ය මකුලෑවේ විමල මහා ථේර

== See also ==
- Sri Lankan Buddhism
- Amarapura–Rāmañña Nikāya
- Ambagahawatte Indrasabhawara Gnanasami Maha Thera
- Rāmañña Nikāya in Myanmar
