= Amarapura Nikāya =

Sri Lankan Buddhist monastic order, originated from Myanmar

Maha Vihara Lineage Sri Lanka Amarapura Maha Sangha Council
- Amarapura Maha Nikaya
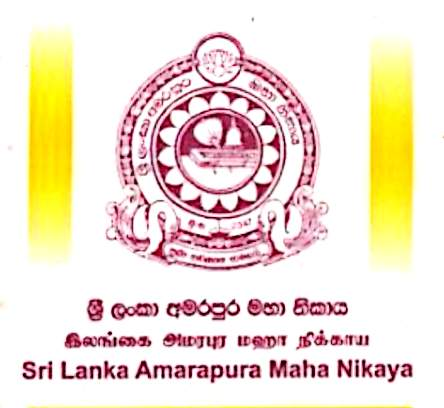
- Official emblem of the Amarapura Maha Sangha Sabha
- Abbreviation: Amarapura
- Formation: 1802
- Founder: Ven. Welitara Ñāṇavimalatissa Maha Nayaka Thera
- Type: Buddhist monastic order
- Legal status: Theravāda Buddhist monastic order
- Purpose: To confer higher ordination (Upasampadā) without caste discrimination and to propagate pure Theravāda Buddhism
- Headquarters: ● Amarapura Maha Sangha Sabha Office, Colombo – for the entire Amarapura Sangha Sabha ● Sri Ambarukkarama Mula Maha Vihara, Ambagahapitiya, Welitara – Amarapura Mula Maha Nikaya ● Shailabimbarama Mula Maha Vihara, Dodanduwa – Amarapura Sri Kalyaniwansa Chapter
- Location(s): Sri Lanka and worldwide
- Official language: Sinhala, Pali, English, Sanskrit
- Supreme Mahanayaka: Most Ven. Karagoda Uyangoda Maithrimurthi Supreme Mahanayaka Thera (since 2024)

The Amarapura Nikāya (Sinhala: අමරපුර මහ නිකාය) was a Sri Lankan monastic fraternity (gaṇa or nikāya) founded in 1800. It is named after the city of Amarapura, Burma, the capital of the Konbaung dynasty of Burma at that time. Amarapura Nikaya monks are Theravada Buddhists. On 16 August 2019, the Amarapura and Rāmañña Nikāya were unified as the Amarapura–Rāmañña Nikāya, making it the largest Buddhist fraternity in Sri Lanka.

== History ==
By the mid-18th century, upasampada – higher ordination as a bhikkhu (monk), as distinct from sāmaṇera or novitiate ordination – had become extinct in Sri Lanka. The Buddhist order had become extinct thrice during the preceding five hundred years and was reestablished during the reigns of Vimaladharmasuriya I of Kandy (1591–1604) and Vimaladharmasuriya II of Kandy (1687–1707). These reestablishments were short lived. During this period the Vinaya was virtually abandoned and some members of the Sangha in the Kingdom of Kandy privately held land, had wives and children, resided in private homes and were called Ganinnanses. On the initiative of Weliwita Sri Saranankara Thera (1698–1778) the Thai monk Upali Thera visited Kandy during the reign of Kirti Sri Rajasinha of Kandy (1747–1782) and once again reestablished the Buddhist order in Sri Lanka in 1753. It was called the Siam Nikaya after a name for Thailand.

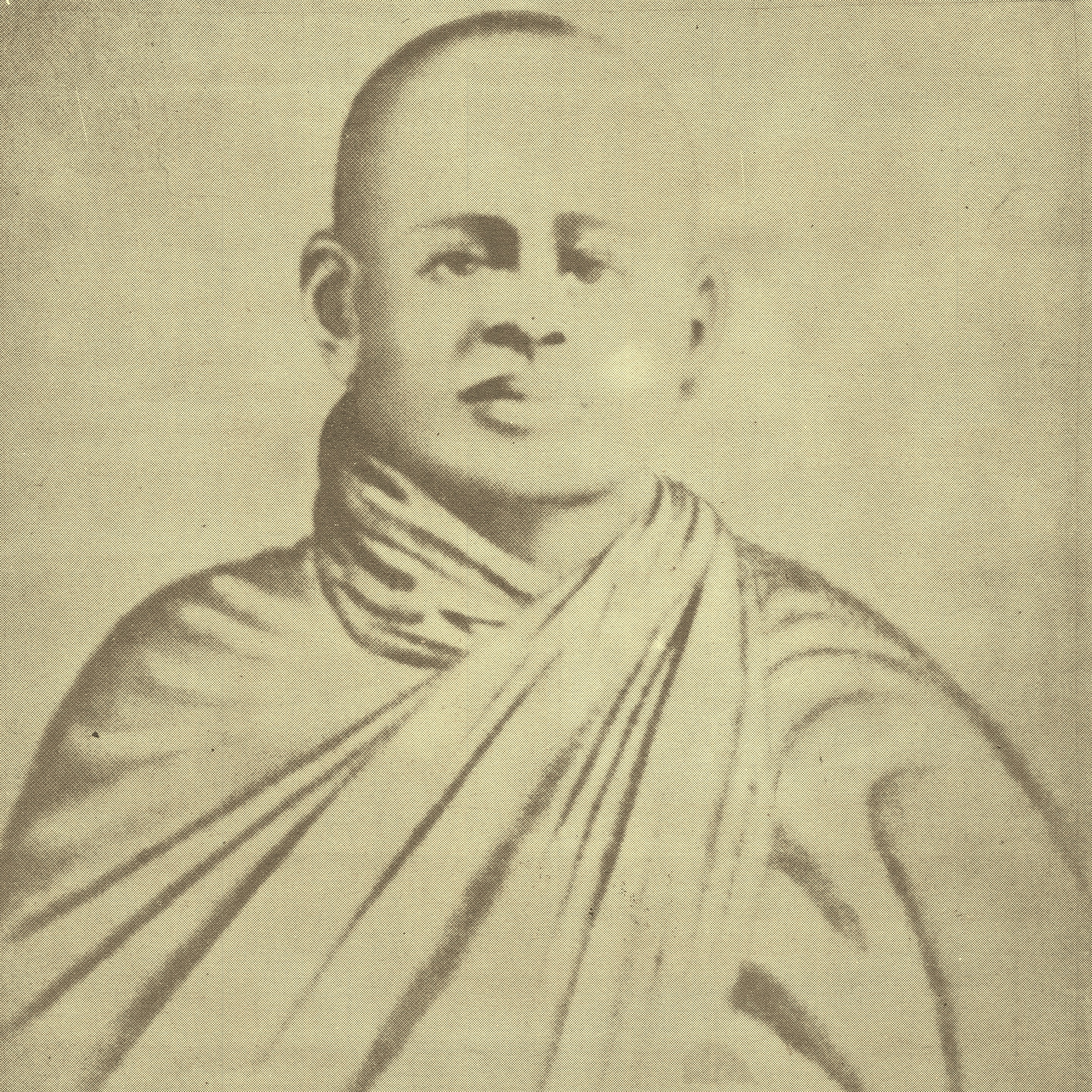
Walitota Sri Gnanawimalatisssa Maha Thera (The Founder of Amarapura Nikaya)

However, in 1764, merely a decade after the reestablishment of the Buddhist order in Sri Lanka by reverend Upali, a group within the newly created Siam Nikaya succeeded in restricting upasampada only to the Govigama caste. It was a period when the traditional nobility of the Kingdom of Kandy was decimated by continuous wars with the Dutch rulers of the maritime provinces. In the maritime provinces too, a new order was replacing the old. Mandarampura Puvata, a text from the Kandyan period, narrates the above radical changes to the monastic order and shows that it was not a unanimous decision by the body of the sangha. It says that thirty-two 'senior' members of the Sangha who opposed this change were banished to Jaffna by the leaders of the reform.

The Govigama exclusivity of the Sangha thus secured in 1764 was almost immediately challenged by other castes who without the patronage of the King of Kandy or of the British, held their own upasampada ceremony at Totagamuwa Vihara in 1772. Another was held at Tangalle in 1798. Neither of these ceremonies were approved by the Siam Nikaya which claimed that these were not in accordance with the Vinaya rules. King Rajadhi Rajasinghe (1782–1798) had made an order restricting the right of obtaining higher ordination to the members of a particular caste.

As a consequence of this 'exclusively Govigama' policy adopted in 1764 by the Siyam Nikaya, the Buddhists in the maritime provinces were denied access to a valid ordination lineage. Hoping to rectify this situation, wealthy laymen from the maritime provinces financed an expedition to Siam to found a new monastic lineage.

In 1799, Walitota Sri Gnanawimalatisssa a monk from the Salagama caste, from Balapitiya on the south western coast of Sri Lanka, departed for Siam with a group of novices to seek a new succession of Higher ordination. Two Sahabandu Mudaliyars and the other prominent dayakayas undertook to bear the expenses of the mission and make the necessary arrangements for the journey. But during the trip, they had an incident where the ship suddenly stopped moving. Once it was able to move again, the Dutch-national captain of the ship suggested that Buddhism was in a more flourishing condition in Amarapura, Burma, than in Siam. The monk agreed to the suggestion of the captain and the latter, through the Dutch consul at Hanthawaddy (now Bago, Burma), obtained the necessary introductions to the religious and administrative authorities in Amarapura. The first bhikkhu was ordained in Burma in 1800 by the Sangharaja of Burma, his party having been welcomed to Burma by King Bodawpaya. The members of the mission studied under the Sangharaja for two years.

The initial mission returned to Sri Lanka in 1803. Soon after their return to the island they established a udakhupkhepa sima (a flotilla of boats moved together to form a platform on the water) at the Maduganga River, Balapitiya and, under the most senior Burmese bhikkhus who accompanied them, held an upasampada ceremony on the Uposatha of Vesak. The new fraternity came to be known as the Amarapura Nikaya after the capital city of King Bodawpaya.

Several subsequent trips to Burma by Karava and Durava monks as well, created by 1810 a core group of ordained monks and provided the required quorum for higher ordination of Amarapura Nikaya monks in Sri Lanka. The higher ordination denied to them in 1764 by the Govigama conspirators had been regained and they were soon granted recognition by the colonial British government. However, the radical change of ordination rules by the Siam Nikaya in 1764 and its continuance despite it being contrary to the teachings of the Gautama Buddha, plagues the Sri Lankan Buddhist Sangha, which remains divided on caste lines.

On the contrary, the mostly post 13th Century Dravidian migrant origins of the Durava, Karava and Salagama have been used as a justification for favouring largely pre-13th Century Sinhalese by the Siyam Nikaya.

== Significance ==
The establishment of the Amarapura Nikaya was significant because it signaled a change in the social dynamic of Buddhism in Sri Lanka. For the first time, a monastic lineage had been created not through royal patronage of a Buddhist king, but through the collective action of a dedicated group of Buddhist laymen. The Amarapura Nikaya was thus both independent of government and royal power, and more closely tied to its patrons in the growing middle class. This presaged both the growing power of the middle class in Sri Lanka during the 18th and 19th centuries, and the rise of so-called Protestant Buddhism among the Sinhalese middle class – a modernised form of Buddhism in which increasing power and authority were vested in the laity, rather than monastic authorities.

== Amarapura Mahasangha Sabha ==
The Amaprapura nikaya which was divided in to several sub nikayas (sub-orders) in the past was united on the initiatives taken by Balangoda Ananda Maitreya Thera and Madihe Pannaseeha Thera in the late 1960s. 'Sri Lanka Amarapura Mahasangha Sabha' was formed and a common higher ordination ceremony for all Amarapura nikaya was performed at the Uposathagharaya situated at Siri Vajiranana Dharmayatanaya, Maharagama on July 13, 1969. The event was graced by William Gopallawa, the Governor-General of Ceylon. A Supreme Mahanayaka position for the Sri Lanka Amarapura Mahasangha Sabha was created with this initiative and Madihe Pannaseeha Thera was appointed as the first monk to hold the prestigious title. In addition to the Supreme Mahanayaka position a post for the president of the Amarapura Nikaya was created and Balangoda Ananda Maitreya Thera was appointed as the first president of Amarapura Mahasangha Sabha. On 16 August 2019, the Amarapura and Ramanna Nikaya were unified as the Amarapaura-Ramanna Samagri Maha Sangha Sabha, making it the largest Buddhist fraternity in Sri Lanka.

The following is a list of Supreme Mahanayaka Theras of the Amarapura Nikaya.

#	Name	From	To
1	Most Ven. Madihe Pannaseeha Thera	13 July 1969	9 September 2003
2	Most Ven. Davuldena Gnanissara Thera	September 2003	3 April 2017
3	Most Ven. Kotugoda Dhammawasa Thera	3 August 2017	22 March 2021
4	Most Ven. Dodampahala Chandasiri Thera	20 July 2021	16 May 2023
5	Most Ven. Karagoda Uyangoda Maithri Murthy Thera	26 November 2024	Present

== Sub-orders ==
Right before its unification into the Amarapura–Rāmañña Nikāya, the Amarapura Nikāya was divided into no less than 21 sub-orders. These sub orders are believed to have been formed along caste divisions and regional differences.

1. Amarapura Sirisaddhammawansa Maha Nikaya
2. Amarapura Mulawamsika Nikaya
3. Udarata Amarapura Nikaya
4. Amarapura Sabaragamu Saddhamma Nikaya
5. Saddhamma Yutthika (Matara) Nikaya
6. Dadalu Paramparayatta Amarapura Nikaya
7. Amarapura Mrammawansabhidhaja
8. Amarapura Vajirawansa Nikaya
9. Kalyanavansika Sri Dharmarama Saddhamma Yuttika Nikaya
10. Sri Lanka Svejin Maha Nikaya
11. Sabaragamu Saddhammawansa Nikaya
12. Amarapura Ariyavansa Saddhamma Yuttika Nikaya
13. Culagandhi Nikaya
14. Udarata Amarapura Samagri Sangha Sabhawa
15. Uva Amarapura Nikaya
16. Amarapura Sri Dhammarakshita Nikaya
17. Udukinda Amarapura Nikaya
18. Sambuddha Sasanodaya Sangha Sabhawa
19. Amarapura Maha Nikaya
20. Amarapura Nikaya
21. Sri Kalyaniwansa Nikaya

== Administrative Structure of the Sri Lanka Amarapura Maha Sangha Council ==
Administrative Flow Chart of the Sri Lanka Amarapura Maha Nikaya

Supreme Mahanayaka Thera
⬇️
President Thera and Executive Council of the Amarapura Maha Sangha Council
⬇️

(All divisions listed below are represented at an equal level)

- Amarapura Sri Kalyaniwansa Chapter

↳ Mahanayaka Thera

↳ Executive Sangha Council with Deputy Mahanayaka Theras

↳ Tapovana Tradition
↳ Mahamevnawa Sangha Council (Mahamevnawa Buddhist Monastery Network)

- Amarapura Ambagahapitiya Chapter
  (Amarapura Mula Maha Nikaya)

↳ Mahanayaka Thera

↳ Executive Sangha Council with Deputy Mahanayaka Theras

- Amarapura Mulawanshika Chapter

↳ Mahanayaka Thera

↳ Executive Sangha Council with Deputy Mahanayaka Theras

↳ Amarapura Sri Saddharmodaya Sangha Sabha
(Sirisugatha Sasanodaya Sangha Sabha)

- Amarapura Siri Saddhammavansa Chapter

↳ Mahanayaka Thera

↳ Executive Sangha Council with Deputy Mahanayaka Theras

- Amarapura Chulagandhi Chapter

↳ Mahanayaka Thera

↳ Executive Sangha Council with Deputy Mahanayaka Theras

- Amarapura Sambuddha Sasanodaya Sangha Sabha

↳ Mahanayaka Thera

↳ Executive Sangha Council with Deputy Mahanayaka Theras

- Amarapura Chapter

↳ Mahanayaka Thera

↳ Executive Sangha Council with Deputy Mahanayaka Theras

- Udarata Amarapura Chapter

↳ Mahanayaka Thera

↳ Executive Sangha Council with Deputy Mahanayaka Theras

- Udarata Amarapura Samagri Sangha Sabha

↳ Mahanayaka Thera

↳ Executive Sangha Council with Deputy Mahanayaka Theras

- Amarapura Sri Dharmarakshitavansa Chapter

↳ Mahanayaka Thera

↳ Executive Sangha Council with Deputy Mahanayaka Theras

- Amarapura Saddhammayuktika Chapter

↳ Mahanayaka Thera

↳ Executive Sangha Council with Deputy Mahanayaka Theras

- Amarapura Saddhammayuktika Matara Chapter

↳ Mahanayaka Thera

↳ Executive Sangha Council with Deputy Mahanayaka Theras

↳ Arisimale Forest Hermitage Network

- Amarapura Sri Dharmarama Saddhammayuktika Chapter

↳ Mahanayaka Thera

↳ Executive Sangha Council with Deputy Mahanayaka Theras

- Amarapura Ariyawansa Saddhammayuktika Chapter

↳ Mahanayaka Thera

↳ Executive Sangha Council with Deputy Mahanayaka Theras

- Amarapura Brahmavansabhidhaja Saddhammayuktika Chapter

↳ Mahanayaka Thera

↳ Executive Sangha Council with Deputy Mahanayaka Theras

- Vajiravansa Chapter of the Amarapura Maha Nikaya

↳ Mahanayaka Thera

↳ Executive Sangha Council with Deputy Mahanayaka Theras

- Amarapura Sirisumana (Dadalu) Chapter

↳ Mahanayaka Thera

↳ Executive Sangha Council with Deputy Mahanayaka Theras

- Amarapura Ekneligoda Vihara Chapter

↳ Mahanayaka Thera

↳ Executive Sangha Council with Deputy Mahanayaka Theras

- Amarapura Iddamalgoda Vihara Chapter

↳ Mahanayaka Thera

↳ Executive Sangha Council with Deputy Mahanayaka Theras

- Uva Amarapura Chapter

↳ Mahanayaka Thera

↳ Executive Sangha Council with Deputy Mahanayaka Theras

- Amarapura Uva Udukinda Chapter

↳ Mahanayaka Thera

↳ Executive Sangha Council with Deputy Mahanayaka Theras

- Amarapura Rassagala Chapter

↳ Mahanayaka Thera

↳ Executive Sangha Council with Deputy Mahanayaka Theras

- Amarapura Swejin Chapter

↳ Mahanayaka Thera

↳ Executive Sangha Council with Deputy Mahanayaka Theras

- Sabaragamuwa Amarapura Chapter

↳ Mahanayaka Thera

↳ Executive Sangha Council with Deputy Mahanayaka Theras

== Organizational Structure of Offices within a Chapter of the Amarapura Sangha Council ==
Organizational Structure of Offices within a Chapter of the Amarapura Nikaya

Amarapura Nikaya Chapter
⬇️
Mahanayaka Thera
⬇️
Deputy Mahanayaka Theras
⬇️
Thirty-Member Executive Sangha Council
⬇️
Executive Working Sangha Council

Secretary-General Division

- Chief Secretary-General Thera

↳ Deputy Secretary-General Thera

Chief Sanghanayaka Division

- Provincial Chief Sanghanayaka Theras

↳ Deputy Chief Sanghanayaka Theras

- District/Regional Chief Sanghanayaka Theras

↳ Deputy Chief Sanghanayaka Theras

Judicial Sanghanayaka Division

- Chief Judicial Sanghanayaka Thera

↳ Provincial Judicial Sanghanayaka Theras

↳ District/Regional Judicial Sanghanayaka Theras

↳ Deputy District/Regional Judicial Sanghanayaka Theras

== Mahanayaka Theras of the Chapters of the Sri Lanka Amarapura Maha Nikaya ==
The Supreme Mahanayaka Thera is a special position of the Amarapura Maha Sangha Council.

Chapter	Mahanayaka Thera	Deputy Mahanayaka/Anunayaka Thera(s)
Office of the Supreme Mahanayaka representing all chapters	Most Ven. Karagoda Uyangoda Maithrimurthi Mahanayaka Thera	None
Rassagala Chapter of the Amarapura Maha Nikaya	Most Ven. Karagoda Uyangoda Maithri Murthi Mahanayaka Thera Supreme Mahanayaka of the Amarapura Maha Sangha Sabha Sri Dharmananda Vidyayatana Pirivena, Balangoda	Ven. Pallewela Visuddhajeeva Anunayaka Thera Sri Sudarshanaramaya, Belihuloya
Amarapura Sri Kalyaniwansa Chapter	Most Ven. Devinuwara Sirisunanda Mahanayaka Thera Parama Vichitrarama Raja Maha Vihara, Devinuwara	1. Ven. Kotapola Amarakitti Thera; Shanthi Foundation and Seruwila Buddhist Centre, Bauddhaloka Mawatha, Colombo: 2. Most Venerable Tapovanaye Nivatha Thera; Abhayabhumi Tapovanaya, Kegalle: 3. Ven. Tapovanaye Mithabhani Thera; Gothama Tapovanaya, Kalapaluwawa, Rajagiriya
Amarapura Mulawanshika Chapter	Most Ven. Ahungalle Vimaladhammatissa Mahanayaka Thera Ambarukkarama Mula Maha Vihara, Balapitiya	1. Ven. Yogiyane Sobhitatissa Thera; Jayasindararamaya, Yogiya: 2. Ven. Kaluwamodara Seelaratanatissa Thera; Keshthasanna Maha Vihara, Aluthgama
Amarapura Siri Saddhammavansa Chapter	Most Ven. Ahungalle Siri Seelavisuddhi Mahanayaka Thera Rangiri Ulpath Raja Maha Vihara, Trincomalee	Ven. Kosgoda Subhuti Thera Sangharaja Vihara, Ambalangoda
Udarata Amarapura Chapter	Most Ven. Nikapotha Chandajothi Gnanananda Buddhist Centre, Madiwela	None
Amarapura Chapter	Most Ven. Kahapola Sugatharatana Mahanayaka Thera Rankoth Vihara, Panadura	None
Ambagahapitiya Chapter of the Sri Lanka Amarapura Maha Nikaya	Most Ven. Madampagama Assaji Tissa Mahanayaka Thera Sri Isipathanaramaya, Vincent Perera Mawatha, Colombo 14	Ven. Randombe SumanalokatissaThera Enasarukkaramaya, Nawattuduwa
Amarapura Sri Dharmarakshita Nikaya	Most Ven. Trincomalee Ananda Mahanayaka Thera Siri Vajiraramaya, Colombo 05	Ven. Watagedara Vimalabuddhi Thera Siri Pannatilakaramaya, Maharagama
Amarapura Saddhammayuktika Matara Chapter	Most Ven. Ambalangoda Sudhamma Mahanayaka Thera Sri Vijayarama Vihara, Ambalangoda	None
Amarapura Ariyawansa Saddhammayuktika Chapter	None	1. Ven. Walpola Vimalagnana Thera; Sri Gangarama Maha Vihara, Peliyagoda: 2. Ven. Navagamuwe Revatha Thera; Sri Pushparamaya, Pepiliwela: 3. Ven. Ihalamulle Sugunawansa Thera; Sri Bodhirajaramaya Mula Maha Vihara, Ankumbura
Vajiravansa Chapter of the Amarapura Maha Nikaya	Most Ven. Pallekande Rathanasara Mahanayaka Thera Sri Sariputtaramaya, Narahenpita, Colombo 08	None
Amarapura Sirisumana (Dadalu) Chapter	Most Ven. Kolonnawa Siri Sumangala Mahanayaka Thera Sri Dewram Maha Vihara, Pannipitiya	1. Ven. Kathaluwe Rathanaseeha Thera; Sri Sambuddhajayanthi Vihara, Moratuwa: 2. Ven. Pallepola Devananda Thera; Sri Jayanthi Maha Vihara, Galaliyadda, Mabowala
Amarapura Chulagandhi Chapter	Most Ven. Gantune Assaji Mahanayaka Thera Ulgala Purana Vihara, Gantuna	1. Ven. Karawe Vijayatissa Thera; Nandana Vihara, Pitigala: 2. Ven. Welitara Amarananda Thera; Pulinataramaya, Ahungalla: 3. Ven. Radawadunne Assaji Thera; Parami Dharmashramaya, Radawadunna
Ekneligoda Vihara Chapter of the Sri Lanka Amarapura Maha Nikaya	Most Ven. Kadangoda Saddhananda (Acting Mahanayaka Thera) Sri Shailarama Maha Vihara, Balangoda	Ven. Paligala Narada Thera Sri Pushparama Asu Maha Sravaka Maha Vihara, Eheliyagoda
Iddamalgoda Vihara Chapter of the Amarapura Maha Nikaya	Most Ven. Kadangoda Samitha Mahanayaka Thera Sri Vijayindarama, Kahawatta	1. Ven. Karawita Sujatha Thera; Sirinivasarama Mula Maha Vihara, Udakarawita: 2. Ven. Pelmadulle Rathanasiri Thera; Sudharmodaya Pirivena, Pelmadulla

== See also ==
- Amarapura–Rāmañña Nikāya
- Sri Lankan Buddhism
- Weligama Sri Sumangala Mahanayake Thera
- Gangodawila Soma Thera
