= List of converts to Buddhism =

Notable people who converted to Buddhism

The following people are all converts to Buddhism.

== From Atheism or Agnosticism ==
Name	Profession/Background	References
Akshara Haasan	Indian actress and model	
Brittney Palmer	American actress	
Stephen Batchelor	British author and former Tibetan Buddhist monk	
E. F. Schumacher	German-British economist and author	
Jorge Sassi	Argentine actor	
Shaila Catherine	American meditation teacher	
Sister Uppalavanna	German Buddhist nun and violinist	
Ludwig Ankenbrand	German Buddhist teacher, journalist, and activist	
Sangharakshita	British Buddhist teacher	

== From Abrahamic religions ==
=== From Christianity ===
Name	Former denomination	Nationality	Notes	Refs.
Cher	Armenian Apostolic Church	American	musician and actress	
Nyanatiloka Mahathera (Anton Walther Florus Gueth)	Catholic Church	German	one of the earliest western Buddhist monks and founder of Island Hermitage	
Penélope Cruz	Catholic Church	Spanish	actress and model	
Eileen Gu	Anglicanism	Chinese-American	freestyle skier	
Anthony Lee	Baptist	American	actor and activist	
Ananda Metteya (Charles Henry Allan Bennett)	Catholic Church	British	one of the earliest western Buddhist monk and established the first Buddhist Mission in the United Kingdom	
Chris Evans	Catholic Church	American	actor and producer	
Thomas William Rhys Davids	Congregationalism	British	scholar of the Pāli language and founder of Pali Text Society	
Colonel Henry Steel Olcott	Presbyterianism	American	military officer, lawyer and first well-known American to make a formal conversion to Buddhism	
Lokanatha (Salvatore Cioffi)	Catholic Church	Italian	Theravadin Buddhist missionary monk	
Roberto Baggio	Catholic Church	Italian	footballer	
Kotahene Soma Maha Thera	Catholic Church	Sri Lankan	Theravadin Buddhist monk, translator and missionary	
Aliana Lohan	Catholic Church	American	actress, singer and fashion model	
Alanis Morissette	Catholic Church	American	singer-songwriter and musician	
Sophia Abrahão	Catholic Church	Brazilian	model and actress	
Venerable Gotamī (Martina Catania)	Catholic Church	Italian	bhikkuni and author	
Solomon Bandaranaike	Anglicanism	Sri Lankan	former Prime Minister of Sri Lanka and founder of Sri Lanka Freedom Party	
Melody Gardot	Dutch Reformed Church	American	singer and model	
Catherine Spaak	Protestantism	French	actress and singer	
Dewi Lestari	Catholic Church	Indonesian	writer, singer-songwriter	
Dayenne Mesquita	Catholic Church	Brazilian	actress and model	
Prince Esper Esperovich Ukhtomsky	Russian Orthodox Church	Russian	poet, publisher and Oriental enthusiast	
Helena Blavatsky	Russian Orthodox Church	Russian	philosopher, occultist, founder of the Theosophical Society	
Richard Tiffany Gere	Methodism	American	actor and producer, co-founder of Tibet House US	
Jimmy Barnes	Protestantism	Australian	singer and rapper	
Orlando Bloom	Church of England	English	actor and leading man in Hollywood films	
Ajahn Sumedho (Robert Karr Jackman)	Episcopal Church (United States)	American	the one who introduced Thai Forest Tradition to the West and most senior western disciple of Ajahn Chah	
Ajahn Viradhammo (Vitauts Akers)	Lutheranism	Canadian	senior western disciple of Ajahn Chah, founder & abbot of Tisarana Buddhist Monastery	
Ajahn Brahm	Not specific	English	senior western disciple of Ajahn Chah and abbot of Bodhinyana Monastery	
Ajahn Candasiri	Not specific	Scottish	Theravada Buddhist nun of Thai Forest Tradition and one of the senior monastics in western Buddhist circle	
Ayya Nirodha (Elizabeth Gorski)	Catholic Church	Austrian, later Australian	Theravada Buddhist nun of Thai Forest Tradition, former Abbess of Santi Forest Monastery	
Tara Brach	Unitarianism	American	psychologist and founder of the Insight Meditation Community of Washington, D.C. (IMCW)	
Belinda Carlisle	Southern Baptist Convention	American	singer (the Go-Go's), songwriter	
Houn Jiyu-Kennett	Church of England	English	Soto Zen rōshi and founder of Shasta Abbey	
John Daido Loori	Catholic Church	American	Zen Buddhist rōshi, abbot of Zen Mountain Monastery	
Ananda Claude Dalenberg	Dutch Reformed Church	American	Zen priest ordained by Shunryū Suzuki	
Michael David Zimmerman	Episcopal Church (United States)	American	prominent attorney and former justice of the Utah Supreme Court	
William Oliver Stone	Episcopal Church (United States)	American	film director, producer, and screenwriter	
Pema Chödrön	Catholic Church	American	Tibetan Buddhist nun	
Fabian Fucan	Catholic Church (Society of Jesus)	Japanese	writer of tracts, at first supporting Christianity and then criticizing it	
Ko Ye Lwin	Not specific	Burmese	prominent musician, guitarist and peace activist	
Alfred Bloom	Evangelicalism	American	professor and dean of the Institute of Buddhist Studies	
Seungsahn Haengwon	Presbyterianism	Korean	Seon master and the founder of Kwan Um School of Zen	
Junius Richard Jayewardene	Not specific	Sri Lankan	first President of Sri Lanka and former Prime minister	
Steve Jobs	Lutheranism	American	co-founder of Apple Computer, Inc.	
Charles R. Johnson	African Methodist Episcopal Church	American	political cartoonist, novelist and Buddhist writer	
Dewi Lestari	Pentecostalism	Indonesian	singer and writer	
Tsai Chih Chung	Catholic Church	Taiwanese	famous cartoonist, well known in both Taiwan and mainland China	
Leung Man-tao	Catholic Church	Chinese	writer, critic and host	
Christine Rankin	Catholic Church	New Zealander	politician and former civil servant who served as head of the Ministry of Social Development	
Seta Manoukian	Armenian Apostolic Church	Armenian	Armenian painter	
Tina Turner	Baptist	Swiss	singer and actress	
Herman Vetterling	Swedenborgianism	American	mystic but he retained elements of Swedenborg thought after his conversion	
Michael Imperioli	Catholicism	American	actor, writer, director, and musician	
Sam Lao	Church of the East	Chinese	Rishi, Dalit Buddhist and New Age Scientist	
Theodor Schultze	Protestantism	German	Civil servant, religious writer	
Pamela Ayo Yetunde	Methodist	American	Pastoral counselor, hospice worker, writer and educator	

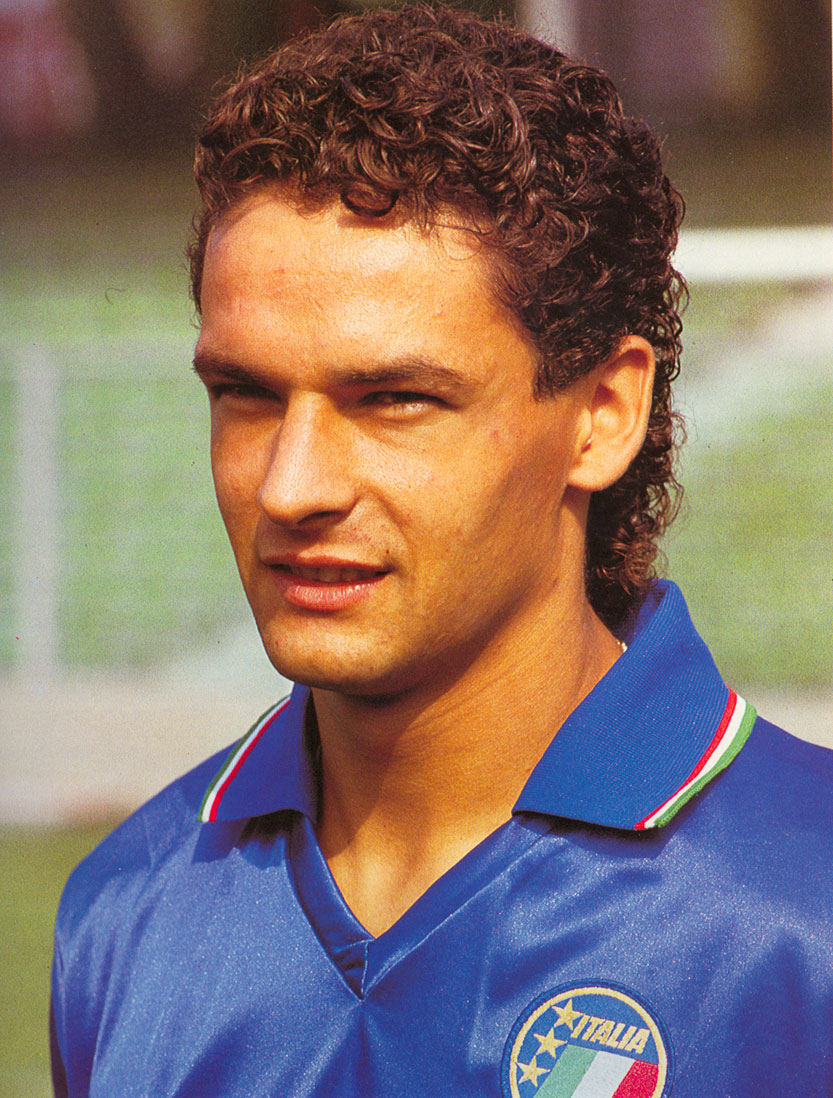
Roberto Baggio

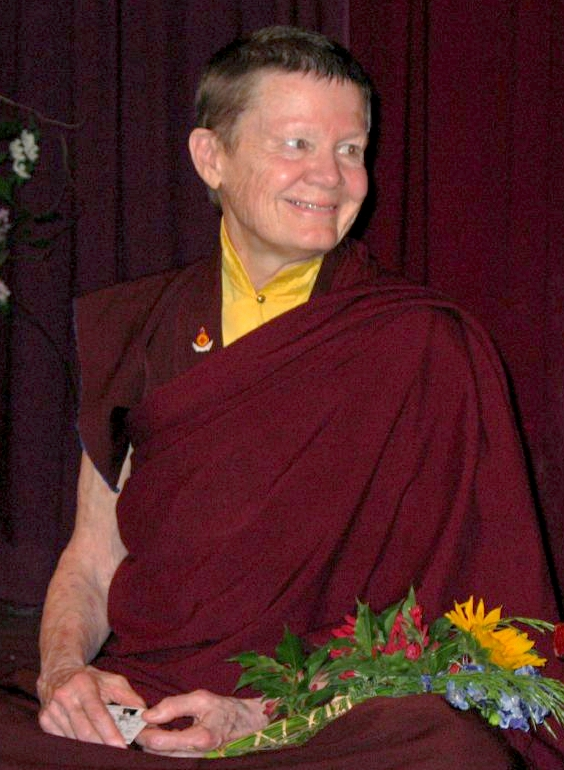
Pema Chödrön

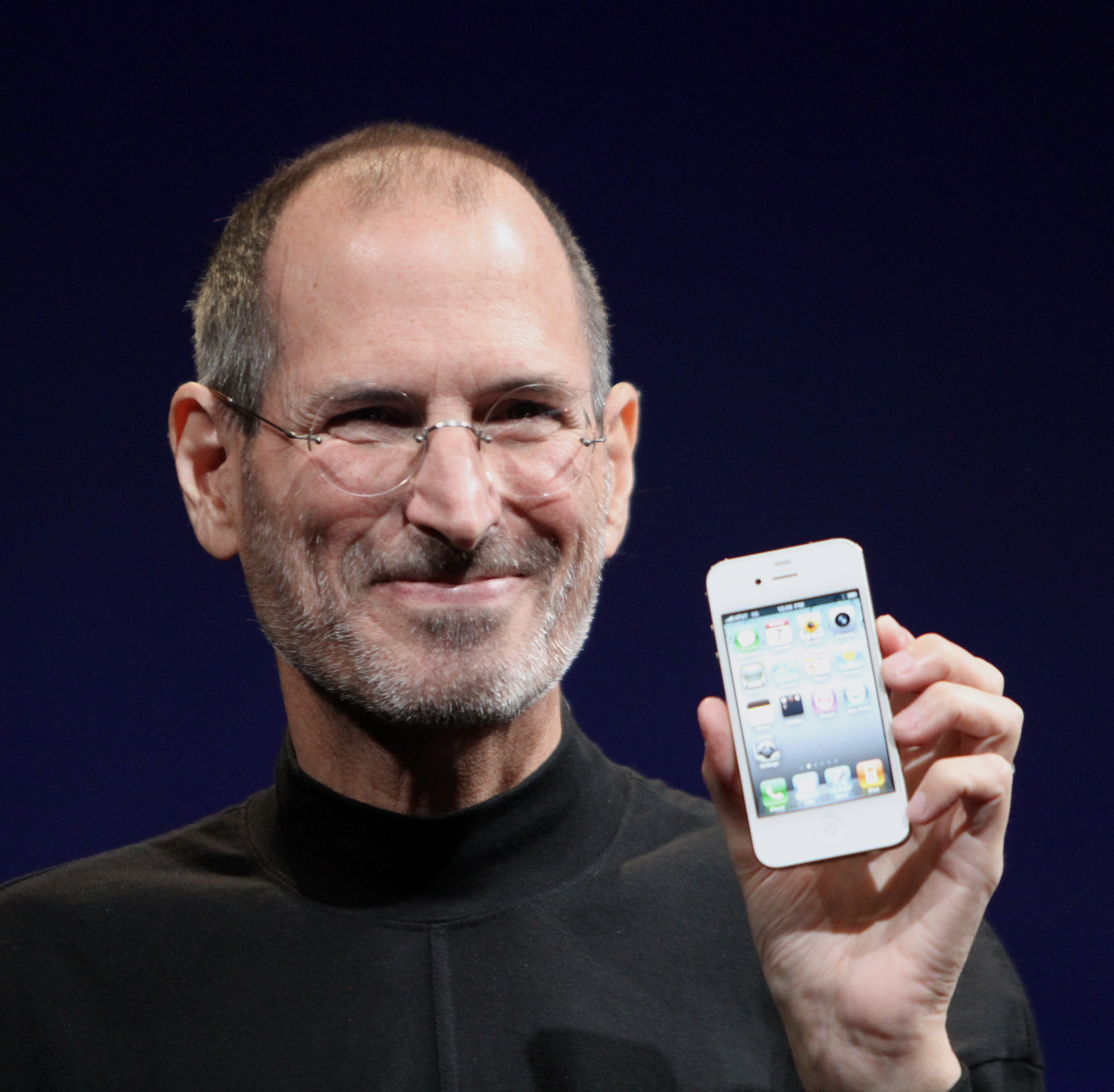
Steve Jobs

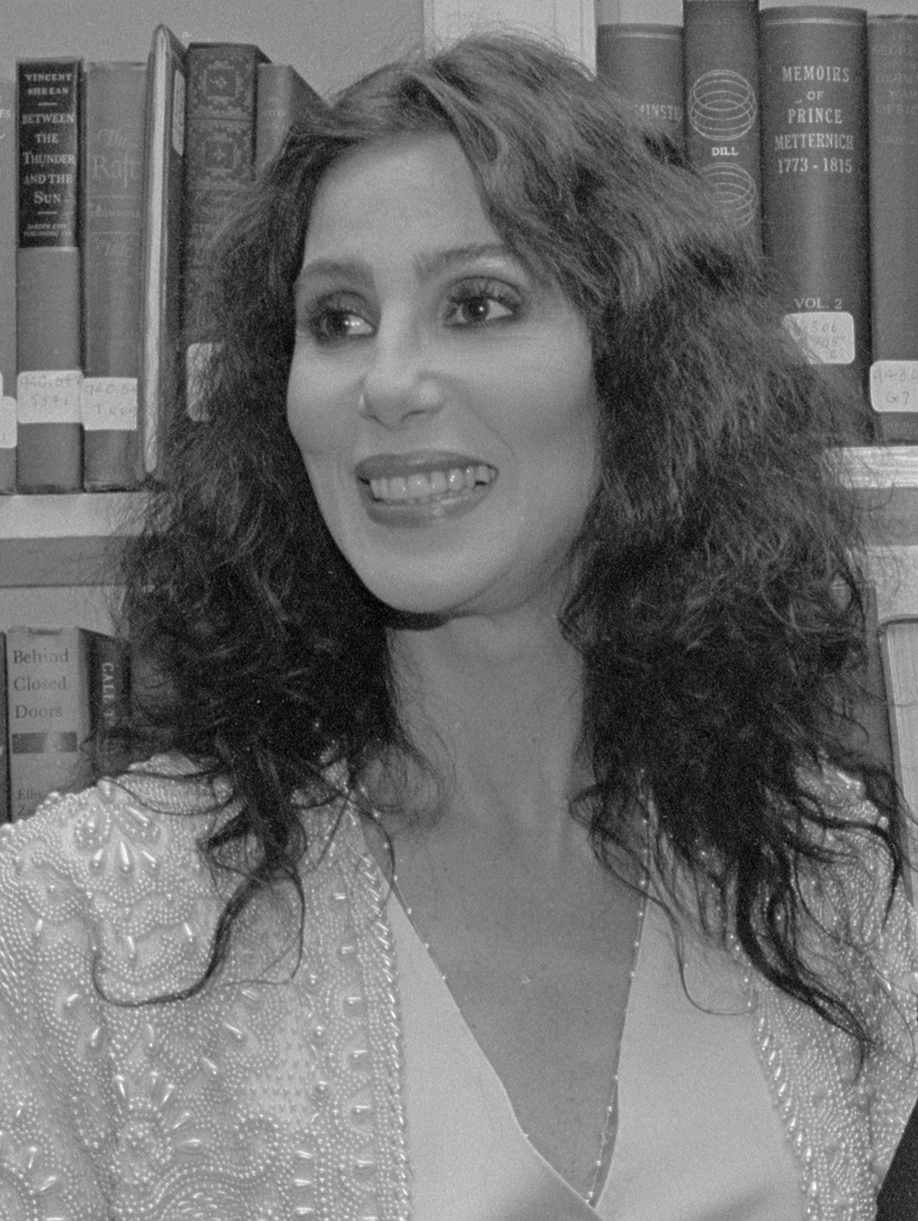
Cher

=== From Islam ===
- Altan Khan was the leader of the Tümed Mongols and ruler of the Right Wing, or western tribes, of the Mongols, and the first Ming Shunyi King.
- Anggun, Indonesian-French singer, songwriter, and television personality.
- Princess Mother Sri Sulalai (1770–1837), the consort of Phra Phutthaloetla Naphalai, Rama II of Siam and was the mother of Nangklao, Rama III.
- The Bunnag family, powerful noble family of Mon-Persian descent of the early Rattanakosin Kingdom of Siam, the descendants of Sheikh Ahmad who converted to Buddhism.
- Jongkol Kittikachorn, wife of Field Marshal Thanom Kittikachorn, the 10th Prime Minister of Thailand. She converted to Buddhism in 1930.
- Karim Samlee, Bangladeshi-Thai magician and actor.
- Lee Yaping, Taiwanese singer. She became famous overnight with the song "Wake Up! Lei Mengna" and is very popular in Hong Kong and Southeast Asia.
- Ipshita Shabnam, Bangladeshi model and actress. She converted to Buddhism while marrying Partha Barua in 2007.
- Napapa Tantrakul (1986–), Thai actress who was raised as Muslim and converted to Buddhism in 2016
- Nora Ariffin, Singaporean actress, fashion model and real estate broker.
- Nusaba Punnakan, Thai actress and presenter. She has been acting since 1992 and is the spouse of politician Puttipong Punnakan.
- Patumwadi Sosaphan, Thai singer and actress. Born in a Muslim family and converted to Buddhism during marriage in 1966.
- Tillakaratne Dilshan (1976–), Sri Lankan cricket player who converted from Islam to Buddhism at the age of 16, previously known as Tuwan Muhammad Dilshan
- Tillakaratne Sampath (1982–), Sri Lankan cricket player who was previously known as Tuwan Mohammad Nishan Sampath
- Suraj Randiv (1985–), Sri Lankan cricket player who was previously known as Mohamed Marshuk Mohamed Suraj
- Pai Hsien-yung (1937–), son of KMT Muslim General Bai Chongxi, a Chinese American writer of Hui descent
- Winai Kraibutr, Thai actor and television personality.
- Wong Ah Kiu (1918–2006), Malay woman born to a Muslim family but raised as Buddhist; her conversion from Islam became a legal issue in Malaysia on her death

=== From Judaism ===
- Nyanaponika Mahathera (1901–1994), German-born Theravada monk, co-founder and first president of the Buddhist Publication Society
- Bhikkhu Bodhi (1944–), American Theravada Buddhist monk and scholar, founder of the Buddhist Global Relief
- Ayya Khema (1923–1997), German Buddhist teacher and one of the organizers for the first International Conference on Buddhist Women
- Larry Rosenberg (1932–), American Buddhist teacher who founded the Cambridge Insight Meditation Center
- Peter Coyote (1941–), American actor and author
- Surya Das (1950–), lama who founded Dzogchen Foundation and Centers
- Tetsugen Bernard Glassman (1939–2018), American Zen Buddhist roshi and co-founder of the Zen Peacemakers
- Zoketsu Norman Fischer (1946–), American poet, writer, and Soto Zen priest and founded the Everyday Zen Foundation
- Zenkei Blanche Hartman (1926–2016), Soto Zen teacher practicing in the lineage of Shunryu Suzuki.
- Kittisaro, disciple of Ajahn Chah and Ajahn Sumedho; meditation teacher in the Thai Forest Tradition
- Hozan Alan Senauke (1947–), Soto Zen priest, folk musician and poet.
- Jack Kornfield (1945–), teacher in the Vipassana Movement of American Theravada Buddhism
- Sharon Salzberg (1952–), meditation teacher and co-founder of the Insight Meditation Society
- Goldie Jeanne Hawn (1945–), American actress, producer, dancer, and singer.
- Steven Seagal (1952–), American actor, producer, screenwriter, martial artist, and musician who holds American, Serbian, and Russian citizenship.
- Robert Downey Jr. (1965–), American actor and producer
- Philip Glass (1937–), American composer and pianist

== From Indian religions ==
=== From Hinduism ===
- B. R. Ambedkar (1891–1956), Chief architect of the Constitution of India
- Jagdish Kashyap (1908–1976), Buddhist monk
- Bhadant Anand Kausalyayan, Buddhist monk, writer, and scholar
- Balachandran Chullikkadu (1957–), Malayalam language poet from Kerala
- Hansika Motwani, indian actress.
- Rahul Sankrityayan (1893–1963), Hindi author and translator
- Iyothee Thass (1845–1914), Siddha practitioner and leader of the Dravidian movement
- Laxman Mane (1949–), Dalit author and social worker
- S. N. Goenka (1924–2013), Vipassanā meditation teacher and founder of Vipassana Research Institute
- Swami Prasad Maurya, politician
- Udit Raj (1958–), prominent Indian social activist and Buddhist polemicist
- Lenin Raghuvanshi (1970–), activist, one of the founding members of People's Vigilance Committee on Human Rights (PVCHR)
- Suresh Bhat (1932–2003), Indian poet and writer
- Pracheen Chauhan, Indian television actor
- Tisca Chopra (1973–), Indian actress, author and film producer
- Vinay Jain, Indian television actor
- Poonam Joshi (1980–), Indian television soap opera actress
- Shibani Kashyap, Indian singer

== From other or undetermined ==
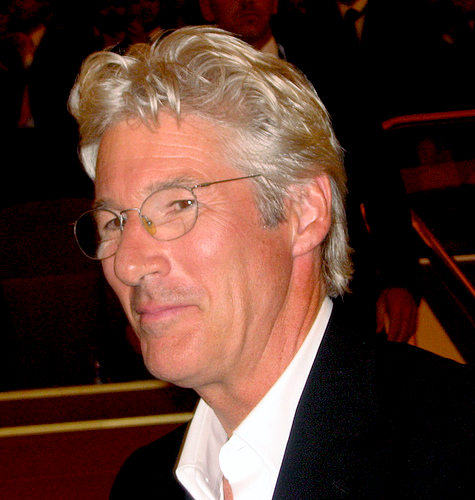
Richard Gere converted to Buddhism.

- Sister Uppalavannā (Else Buchholtz) (1886–1982), German Theravādin Buddhist nun, first European Buddhist nun in modern history
- U Dhammaloka (Laurence Carroll) (1856–1914), Irish-born migrant worker turned Theravādin Buddhist monk and an active role in the Asian Buddhist revival around the turn of the twentieth century
- Paul Dahlke (1865–1928), German physician and a pioneer of Buddhism in Germany, founder of “Das Buddhistische Haus”
- Sīlācāra (John Frederick S. McKechnie) (1871–1951), former Buddhist monk, lay Buddhist writer and translator
- Ñāṇamoli Bhikkhu (Osbert John S. Moore) (1905–1960), British Theravādin Buddhist monk and translator of Pali literature
- Ñāṇavīra Thera (Harold Edward Musson) (1920–1965), British Theravādin Buddhist monk, the author of Notes on Dhamma
- Sāmanera Bodhesako (Robert Smith) (1939–1988), American Theravādin Buddhist monk who founded Path Press
- Robert Baker Aitken (1917–2010), co-founded the Honolulu Diamond Sangha
- Reb Anderson (1943–), Zen teacher
- Alistair Appleton (1970–), British television presenter
- Stephen Batchelor (1953–), writer
- William Sturgis Bigelow (1850–1926), prominent American collector of Japanese art and converted to Tendai Buddhism
- Orlando Bloom (1977–), actor who played Legolas in Lord of the Rings and The Hobbit
- Kate Bosworth (1983–), American actress
- John Cage (1912–1992), American composer
- Arabella Churchill (1949–2007), English charity founder, festival co-founder, and fundraiser
- Chester Carlson (1906–1968), American physicist and inventor, best known for inventing electrophotography
- Leonard Cohen (1934–2016), Canadian singer/songwriter/poet
- John Crook (1930–2011), British ethologist
- Ruth Denison (1922–2015), Vipassana Meditation teacher in United States, one of four Westerners to receive permission to teach from Sayagyi U Ba Khin
- Chris Evans (1981–), American actor and best known for his role as Captain America in the Marvel Cinematic Universe (MCU) series of films.
- Ernest Fenollosa (1853–1908), American professor of philosophy and political economy at Tokyo Imperial University
- Richard Gere (1949–), actor and activist for Tibetan causes
- Allen Ginsberg (1926–1997), poet
- Natalie Goldberg (1948–), writer
- Herbie Hancock (1940–), jazz pianist who has also released funk and disco albums
- Joseph Jarman (1937–), jazz musician and Jodo Shinshu priest
- Miranda Kerr (1983–), model
- k.d. lang (1961–), Canadian singer
- Jet Li (1963–), actor
- Courtney Love, American singer-songwriter
- Menander I (died c. 130 BCE), Greco-Buddhist king (from pre-Christian Hellenistic religion)
- Dennis Genpo Merzel (1944–), abbot of Kanzeon Zen Center
- Alanis Morissette, Canadian-American singer
- Ole Nydahl (1941–), lama teacher
- Tenzin Palmo (1943–), nun of Drukpa Kagyu lineage
- Li Gotami Govinda (Ratti Petit) (1906–1988), Indian painter, photographer, writer and composer (from Zoroastrianism)
- Zeena Schreck (formerly LaVey) (1963–), Berlin-based American visual and musical artist, author, the spiritual leader of the Sethian Liberation Movement (SLM), Tantric Tibetan Buddhist yogini and second daughter of the late Church of Satan's founder Anton LaVey.
- Wayne Shorter (1933–2023), American jazz saxophonist and composer
- Oliver Stone (1946–), American film director
- Sharon Stone (1958–), American actress, producer, and former fashion model
- Tan-luan (6th to 7th century), Chinese Buddhist monk important to Pure Land Buddhism (from Taoism)
- Thích Thanh Từ (1924–), Vietnamese Zen Buddhist monk (from Caodaism)
- Robert Thurman (1941–2026), Buddhist priest and writer who has been called "the Billy Graham of Buddhism"
- Tina Turner (1939–2023), American singer-songwriter, dancer, and actress who has won eight Grammy Awards
- Philip Whalen (1923–2002), Beat Generation poet and Zen monk
- Sister Vajirā (Hannelore Wolf) (1928–1991), German Buddhist convert and former Ten-Precept nun
- Adam Yauch (1964–2012), aka MCA, American rapper (member of Beastie Boys), songwriter, film director, and human rights activist

== See also ==
- List of Buddhists
- List of American Buddhists
- Dalit Buddhist Movement
- List of converts to Buddhism from Christianity
- List of converts to Buddhism from Islam
- Jewish Buddhists
- Index of Buddhism-related articles
