= Nibbāna: The Mind Stilled =

- Author: Most Ven. Katukurunde Nanananda Thera
- Original title: නිවනේ නිවීම (Nivanē nivīma)
- Language: English
- Subject: Dhamma sermons
- Genre: Religious
- Publisher: Dharma Grantha Mudrana Bharaya
- Publication place: Sri Lanka
- English publication date: 2003

Nibbāna: The Mind Stilled (Sinhalese: නිවනේ නිවීම, Nivanē nivīma) is the translation of a series of 33 sermons delivered in Sinhala by Venerable Bhikkhu Katukurunde Ñāṇananda during the late 1980s and early 1990s. The focus of the sermons was on the term nibbāna and its deeper philosophical implications. The first volume of the seven-volume series was published in 2003.

== History ==
It was inspired by an invitation that came from his revered teacher, the late venerable Matara Sri Ñāṇārāma Mahathera, the chief incumbent of the Nissarana Vanaya Hermitage in Meetirigala and an illustrious exponent of Insight Meditation in Sri Lanka. The sermons were delivered once every fortnight before the group of resident monks from August 1988 to January 1991. Thirty three sermons have been published in seven volumes.

Venerable Ñāṇananda had already written four books during the early phase of his monk’s life at Island Hermitage, Dodanduwa. They were Concept and Reality in Early Buddhist Thought, Samyutta Nikaya – An Anthology (Part 2), Ideal Solitude and The Magic of the Mind. He came under the tutelage of the late venerable Matara Sri Ñāṇārama Mahathera when he shifted to Nissarana Vanaya Hermitage in 1972.

== Contents ==
Nibbāna – the Bliss Supreme (Dhammapada 203) is the determined goal of the "spiritual endeavour" in Buddhism. Bhikkhu Ñāṇananda has followed a line of interpretation that highlights the psychological import of the term nibbāna, drawing out at the same time the deeper philosophical implications. The term nibbāna has been examined in the discourses of the Pali canon. In his analysis, he reinterprets the discourses dealing with the law of Dependent arising (paṭiccasmuppāda) and the Middle Path. He expounds on the topics he has briefly dealt with in 'Concept and Reality' and 'Magic of the Mind'. Via media, he has suggested the ‘Relative validity and Pragmatic value of concepts’.

The sermons were studied in a three-year e-learning program (2017–2018) offered by Bhikkhu Anālayo of the Numata Center for Buddhist Studies at the University of Hamburg in cooperation with the Barre Center for Buddhist Studies preserved with Bhikkhu Analayo's commentary, transcripts and audio files at https://www.buddhistinquiry.org/resources/lectures/Barre Center for Buddhist Studies.

=== Topics covered ===
- vaṭṭa – The hidden vortex or whirlpool: Interdependence between Consciousness and Name-and-Form in the formula of Dependent Arising (paṭiccasmuppāda).
- nāma-rūpa – Name-and-Form: The elusive self-image with its ’Formal-Name’ and ’Nominal-Form’.
- anidassana-viññāṇa – Non-Manifestative-Consciousness.
- The cinema simile: An illustration of Dependent Arising (paṭiccasmuppāda).
- satipaṭṭhāna – A scaffolding for the systematic up-building of mindfulness and knowledge.
- papañca and papañca-saṅkhā – conceptual proliferation and prolific concepts.
- phassa – Contact: A hybrid between ‘Verbal Impression’(adhivacana-samphassa) and ‘Resistance Impression’(paṭigha-samphassa).
- dvayatā – Duality: The antinomian conflict.
- The Chess-Game simile: An illustration of duality.
- antojaṭā- bahijaṭā – The Tangle-Within and the Tangle-without ?
- dukkha – Conflict: An alternation between ’This-ness’ (itthabhāva) and ‘Otherwise-ness’(aññathābhāva).
- tathatā – Thusness or Suchness.
- nibbāna: Extinction more dreaded than fire.
- The world arises in the six-sense spheres.
- The dilemma and the tetra-lemma: The ‘Undetermined Points’ (avyākatavatthūni).
- Relative validity and pragmatic value of concepts.
- The Seamstress simile: The ‘two ends and the middle’.
- The Toolkit: The 37 Participative-Factors of Enlightenment.

== Distribution ==
Drawing inspiration from the dictum "The Gift of Dhamma excels all other gifts" (Dhammapada 354), he has specified that all publications should be distributed free as ‘gifts of Dhamma’. The Free Distribution of Dhamma (dhammadāna-ideal) has been upheld by the Buddha in the following exhortation to the monks:

Monks, there are these two kinds of gifts: the gift of material things and the gift of Dhamma. Of these two gifts, monks, this is supreme (namely): the gift of Dhamma.

Monks, there are these two kinds of distribution: the distribution of material things and the distribution of Dhamma. Of these two kinds of distribution, monks, this is supreme (namely): the distribution of Dhamma.

— Itivuttaka 3.5.9

A group of lay enthusiasts initiated the Dhamma Publications Trust (Sinhala: Dharma Grantha Mudrana Bhaaraya – D.G.M.B.) to bring out the sermons in book form. A few years later, an affiliated trust (Sinhala: Dharma Shravana Maadhya Bhaaraya – D.S.M.B.) was set up to make the sermons available in audio form.

== English translation ==
- Nibbana - The Mind Stilled (Vol. I) (PDF), Dharma Grantha Mudrana Bharaya, 2003, ISBN 978-955-8832-02-8
- Nibbana - The Mind Stilled (Vol. II) (PDF), Dharma Grantha Mudrana Bharaya, 2004, ISBN 978-955-9886-42-6
- Nibbana - The Mind Stilled (Vol. III) (PDF), Dharma Grantha Mudrana Bharaya, 2005, ISBN 978-955-1255-05-3
- Nibbana - The Mind Stilled (Vol. IV) (PDF), Dharma Grantha Mudrana Bharaya, 2006, ISBN 978-955-1255-07-7
- Nibbana - The Mind Stilled (Vol. V) (PDF), Dharma Grantha Mudrana Bharaya, 2007, ISBN 978-955-1255-13-8
- Nibbana - The Mind Stilled (Vol. VI) (PDF), Dharma Grantha Mudrana Bharaya, 2010, ISBN 978-955-1255-33-6
- Nibbana - The Mind Stilled (Vol. VII) (PDF), Dharma Grantha Mudrana Bharaya, 2011, ISBN 978-955-1255-34-3

== See also ==
- Conceptual proliferation
