= Ñāṇadīpa Thera =

French-born Theravada Buddhist monk

Ven. Ñāṇadīpa Thera
- Title: Thera (Elder)

Personal life
- Born: Denys Jeune; 12 November 1944 Lyon, France
- Died: 12 September 2020 (aged 75) Sri Lanka
- Occupation: Buddhist monk

Religious life
- Religion: Buddhism
- School: Theravada

Ñāṇadīpa Thera (born Denys Jeune; 12 November 1944 – 12 September 2020), also known locally as Denmark Gnanadeepa Bhante, was a French-born Theravāda Buddhist monk raised in Denmark, ordained in 1971 in Sri Lanka. He is best known for reestablishing a solitary forest tradition in Sri Lanka via the three-walled mud kuṭis (huts) he had built in the Laggala area (in Matale District, Central Province).

== Biography ==
His father, Eugene Jeune was a member of the French resistance movement during World War II, and was arrested by the Gestapo before the birth of his second son, Denys. He likely died when the ship SS Cap Arcona was bombed, carrying thousands of prisoners.

His mother, Renée Jeune (born Duliège) was invited to Denmark by Gregers Jensen, a friend of Eugene's. The two brothers, Denys and Bernard grew up in Augustenborg, Denmark.

He first arrived in Sri Lanka in 1968 after spending time in India, interested in studying the original discourses of the Buddha. During this initial visit, he spent eight months at the Island Hermitage learning Pali and was deeply moved by the austere example of the senior monk Bhante Ñāṇavimala. After a brief visit back to Denmark, he returned to Sri Lanka and received novice ordination (Pabbajjā) at the Island Hermitage on September 29, 1969, where he was given the name Ñāṇadīpa, meaning "Lamp of Knowledge". He later attained higher ordination (Upasampadā) as a bhikkhu on March 22, 1971.

He soon left the Island Hermitage and went to Bundala, where he spent eight years as a hermit, establishing the foundation of his practice while living in the same remote jungle hut previously occupied by Ñāṇavīra Thera. Although the two never met in person, Ñāṇadīpa regarded Ñāṇavīra as his primary teacher and guide, relying on a hand-copied notebook of Notes on Dhamma to build his understanding of the Suttas.

The most defining period of his life as bhikkhu was the 15 years he spent in the Laggala area, where he had several of his signature three-walled mud huts built. These imitated the bareness of "living at the foot of a tree", yet still providing sufficient protection from the weather. He suffered a severe leg injury during an encounter with a wild elephant, but this did not deter him from returning to the forest to continue his practice. Despite his reclusive lifestyle, he also spent time teaching and advising others, often encouraging his fellow monks to pursue solitude. During his time there various legends had spread about "the white bhikkhu" among the villagers he would visit for his daily almsround.

He spent the last years of his life at Bhaddeka Vihari hermitage near Balangoda, his health in decline due to prostate cancer. Nevertheless, he continued advising and teaching his juniors, while not neglecting his own practice either.

== Translation work ==
His translations from the Sutta Nipata were published under the title The Silent Sages of Old. He also provided feedback for Bhikkhu Bodhi's and K. R. Norman's translation work.
