= Conceptual proliferation =

Unabounded conceptualization obscuring the true nature of reality

Translations of papañca
- English: Conceptual proliferation
- Sanskrit: प्रपञ्च (prapañca)
- Pali: papañca
- Chinese: 戏论, 戲論 (Pinyin: xìlùn)
- Japanese: 戯論 (Rōmaji: Keron)

In Buddhism and Advaita Vedanta, conceptual proliferation (Pāli: papañca; Sanskrit: prapañca) or, alternatively, mental proliferation or conceptual elaboration, refers to unbounded conceptualization, "tend[ing] to obscure the true state of affairs."

== Etymology ==
The word prapanca (Sanskrit: प्रपञ्च) means "visible world," "manifoldness of form," "expansion of the universe." According to Mayrhofer, prapanca originally meant an 'endless exposition' ("weitläufige Auseinandersetzung"), as well as "counting on five fingers."

The translation of papañca as conceptual proliferation was first made by Katukurunde Nyanananda Thera in his research monograph Concept and Reality (1971).

== Buddhism ==
=== Prapanca ===
Andrew Olendzki explains that:

P[r]apanca is "the tendency of the mind to 1) spread out from and elaborate upon any sense object that arises in experience, smothering it with wave after wave of mental elaboration, 2) most of which is illusory, repetitive, and even obsessive, 3) which effectively blocks any sort of mental calm or clarity of mind."

=== Aprapanca/nisprapanca ===
Aprapanca is "(that which is) beyond discursive thinking," as stated in the Gaganagañjaparipṛcchā, the eighth chapter of the Mahāsaṃnipāta Sūtra.

Nisprapapanca/'nippapañca is the stopping of discursive thought or conceptualisation. Buswell and Lopez explain nisprapanca as follows:

"conceptual nonproliferation" or "absence of superimposition," the transcendent (lokatara) state of mind that is characteristic of the enlightened noble person (ĀRYA). Nisprapañca refers to the absence of that which is fanciful, imagined, or superfluous, especially in the sense of the absence of a quality that is mistakenly projected onto an object. This false quality is called PRAPAÑCA [...] In the YOGĀCĀRAschool of Mahāyāna Buddhism, nisprapañca refers to the absence of the misapprehension of sensory objects as separate from the perceiving consciousness, and in the MADHYAMAKA school it refers to the absence of perceiving objects as endowed with SVABHĀVA.

== Advaita ==
Fabian Völker explains that prapanca is central to the notion of advaita. "Advaita" (अद्वैत) is from Sanskrit roots a, not; dvaita, "customarily translated as dual." As Advaita, it is usually translated as "not-two" or "one without a second", and most commonly as "nondualism", "nonduality" or "nondual," invoking the notion of a dichotomy. Fabian Völker, following Paul Hacker explains that dvaita does not mean "duality," but "the state in which a second is present," the second here being synonymous with prapanca, "conceptual proliferation," and with jagat, "the world." Advaita thus means that only Brahman, 'the one', is ultimately real, while the phenomenal world, or the conceptual multiplicity, 'the second', is not fully real. The term thus does not emphasize two instances, but the notion that the second instance is not fully real, and advaita is better translated as "that which has no second beside it" instead of "nonduality," denying multiplicity and the proliferation of concepts "that tend to obscure the true state of affairs."

== Nonduality ==
According to Völker, in both Advaita and Mahayana nonduality is the realization of nisprapanca/aprapanca ('nonceptualization', "(that which is) beyond discursive thinking") the annihilation of prapanca (conceptualisation, creating multiplicity by multiplying concepts and subsequent creation of attachment) through insight or meditation:

For Nagarjuna, liberation consists in the coming to rest (upasama) of all subjective perception and sensation (sarva-upalambha) as well as everything objectively perceivable, that is, of prapanca. Sankara, too, speaks of the "complete dissolution" and "melting down" of prapanca (prapanca-pravilaya). Thus, nonduality first refers to ultimate reality (paramatha-tattva/nirguma brahman), which lies beyond concept and percept (nama-rupa) and which remains when prapanca has been eliminated by insight (tattvadarsana/brahmajna) or by meditative or contemplative practices (nisprapanca/aprapanca).

== Textual usage ==
The term is mentioned in a variety of suttas in the Pali canon, such as the Madhupindika Sutta (MN 18), and is mentioned in Mahayana Buddhism and Advaita Vedanta as well.

Anguttara Nikaya IV.173 states:

"As far as the field of sixfold sense-impression extends, so far reaches the world of diffuseness (or the phenomenal world; papañcassa gati); as far as the world of diffuseness extends, so far extends the field of sixfold sense-impression. Through the complete fading away and cessation of the field of sixfold sense-impression, there comes about the cessation and the coming-to-rest of the world of diffuseness (papañca-nirodho papañca-vupasamo).

== See also ==
- Make a mountain out of a molehill
- Monkey mind
- Nibbāna: The Mind Stilled
- Reification (fallacy)

== Sources ==
- Buswell, Robert; Lopez, Donald S. Jr., eds. (2014), The Princeton Dictionary of Buddhism, Princeton University Press, ISBN 978-1-4008-4805-8
- Grimes, John A. (1996). A Concise Dictionary of Indian Philosophy: Sanskrit Terms Defined in English. State University of New York Press. ISBN 978-0-7914-3067-5.
- Katz, Jerry (2007), One: Essential Writings on Nonduality, Sentient Publications
- Ñāṇananda, Bhikkhu Kaṭukurunde (2012) [1971], Concept and Reality in Early Buddhist Thought - An Essay on Papañca and Papañca-Saññâ-Saṅkhāra (PDF), Buddhist Publication Society, ISBN 978-955-24-0136-7
- Sydnor, Jon Paul (2023). "Introduction". In Sydnor, Jon Paul; Watson, Anthony J. (eds.). Nondualism: An Interreligious Exploration. Bloomsbury Publishing.
- Völker, Fabian (2021). "Nondualism". In Goetz, Stewart; Taliafero, Charles (eds.). The Encyclopedia of the Philosophy of Religion. John Wiley & Sons.
- Völker, Fabian (2023). "The Plurality of Nonduality: Toward a Tripartite Typology". In Sydnor, Jon Paul; Watson, Anthony J. (eds.). Nondualism: An Interreligious Exploration. Bloomsbury Publishing.
