= Ludwig Ankenbrand =

German Buddhist

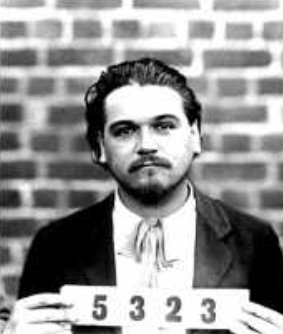
- Born: Ludwig Richard Ankenbrand; 21 April 1888; Nuremberg
- Died: 6 March 1971 (aged 82); Sindelfingen
- Occupation: Activist
- Spouse: Lisbeth Symanzick (m. 1910)

Ludwig Ankenbrand (21 April 1888 – 6 March 1971) was a German Buddhist, journalist and activist for animal welfare and vegetarianism.

== Life ==
Ankenbrand was born in Nuremberg in 1888 to a family of freethinkers. He graduated from the Eberhard-Ludwigs-Gymnasium in Stuttgart. As a teenager Ankenbrand met his idol Christian Wagner (1835–1918) in a village near Stuttgart. Wagner was a farmer and poet who refused to slaughter his cattle. Ankenbrand had authored his first book by 1906. His views on animal welfare and religious humanism attracted interest from freethinkers and those within the Lebensreform movement. Ankenbrand took interest in atheism, naturopathy and vegetarianism.

He joined the German Vegetarian Association and wrote for its magazine Vegetarische Warte (Vegetarian Vantage). He also worked as an animal welfare campaigner in Berlin. In 1910, he married Lisbeth Symanzick, a vegetarian. They moved to Leipzig in 1911 where Ankenbrand was chief editor of the vegetarian magazine Gesundes Leben (Healthy Life) for Hugo Vollrath. Ankenbrand converted to Buddhism in the early 1900s and was a member of the German branch of the Maha Bodhi Society. He authored an article on Buddhism for Buddhistische Warte (Buddhist Vantage), official magazine of the Mahabodhi Gesellschaft.

After World War I he worked in Stuttgart as a magazine editor for the pictorial magazine Stuttgarter Illustriete. During this time he wrote about Buddhism and was the editor of Zeitschrift fur Buddhismus (Magazine for Buddhism). During World War II he worked in Munich as an editor and librarian. Ankenbrand founded Buddhist Congregation Stuttgart until it declined in membership around 1960. In 1961, he moved with his wife to a retirement home where he remained a Buddhist and vegetarian until his death in 1971.

Ankenbrand was critical of Christianity and considered Buddhism to be the most Aryan of religions.

== Animal welfare ==
Ankenbrand was an ardent campaigner for animal welfare. He has been described as consistent in his beliefs. He did not eat meat and he condemned all hunting activities including fishing as unethical. He also opposed the fashion industry slaughtering birds for their feathers. He cited statistics from a Paris newspaper that 300 million birds were being slaughtered for this trivial purpose each year and pushed for legislation outlawing the wearing of feathers. He argued against imprisoning animals in zoos.

== Vegetarian world trip ==
In 1911, Ankenbrand announced a round-the-world trip on foot by a group of vegetarians to explore the way of peoples and religions such as Buddhists and Jains and other lodges and reform societies. The world trip aimed to prove that different groups of people across the earth could exist without eating meat. Ankenbrand stated that he had tested the Kokovorismus (Cocovorism) of August Engelhardt and the Mazdaznan of Otoman Zar-Adusht Ha'nish. In the Buddhist press he advertised the trip as a "Buddhist pilgrimage around the world".

He reported his experiences from the trip in magazines associated with Lebensreform including the Vegetarische Warte or Die Lebenskunst (Art of Living) and a pictorial magazine Nach Feierabend (After Work). The trip started in Taucha in 1912. They walked through Germany, crossing the Alps and visited Monte Verità where Karl Wilhelm Diefenbach resided. After the group split up, Ankenbrand travelled to Egypt and Palestine. In September 1913 he visited a Buddhist monastery on the Ceylonese Polgasduwa Island where he became an ordained Buddhist monk. He lived on the island until February 1914. The trip ended as Ankenbrand was interned in Ceylon during World War I and was shipped to Australia. Ankenbrand and his wife were sent to a camp at Molonglo in Canberra where he served as a teacher in the camp school. After the end of the war they were repatriated to Germany.

== Selected publications ==
- Tierschutz und moderne Weltanschauung [Animal Welfare and a Modern Worldview] (1906)
- Unserer Vöglein Luft und Leid: Vogelschutzgedichte [The Air and Suffering of Our Little Birds: Poems for Bird Protection] (1930)
