= Devalegama =

Settlement in Sri Lanka

Devalegama දේවාලගම
- Town
- Location in Sri Lanka
- Coordinates: 7°17′06.3″N 80°19′18.7″E
- Country: Sri Lanka
- Province: Sabaragamuwa Province
- District: Kegalle District

Area
  - Total: 1.763 km^{2} (0.681 sq mi)
- Elevation: 100 m (330 ft)

Population (2024)
  - Total: 1,725
- Time zone: UTC+05:30 (SLST)
- Postal code: 71050
- Area code: 035

Devalegama (Sinhala: දේවාලගම), also spelt Dewalegama, is a small town in the Kegalle District of Sabaragamuwa Province, Sri Lanka.

== Etymology ==
Devalegama in Sinhalese means "village of the shrine". The townspeople believe that this name originates from the fact that there is an ancient shrine dedicated to one of the local deities in the vicinity of the town.

== Geography ==
The area is surrounded by low hills that have been mostly transformed into rubber plantations. The tallest peak of these is known as navugala, which has a triangulation point of the geodetic survey of Sri Lanka. Among the hills there is a series of long interconnected alluvial-plains that are used for paddy cultivation. There is a small perennial stream that originates from the hills on the south of the town and flows across the center towards north to join the large river known as Ma Oya.

== Transport ==
It located on the A19 highway running from Kegalle to Polgahawela. It is approximately 25.3 km (15.7 mi) south of Kurunegala and 85 km (53 mi) north-east of Colombo.

=== Expressway ===
Devalegama will be one of the important points along phase 2 of the new E04 Central Expressway planned to link Kandy with the capital Colombo.

== Notable residents ==
Venerable Katukurunde Nanananda Thera, the abbot of Pothgulgala Aranya, a small forest monastery in Devalegama.
