= Ratgama Lake =

Lagoon in Galle District, Sri Lanka

- රත්ගම වැව (Sinhala); ரத்கம ஏரிி (Tamil)
- Location in Sri Lanka
- Location: Galle District
- Coordinates: 6°06′36″N 80°08′06″E
- Type: lagoon
- Basin countries: Sri Lanka
- Max. width: 4.0 km (2.5 mi)
- Surface area: 15.71 ha (38.8 acres)
- Average depth: 2.35 m (7.7 ft)
- Max. depth: 3 m (9.8 ft)
- Water volume: 2,903,000 m^{3} (102,500,000 ft^{3})

Ratgama Lake, also known as Rathgama Lake, is a brackish coastal lagoon, situated next to Dodanduwa in south of Sri Lanka. The lake is 15.71 ha (38.8 acres) in area. On its boundaries are the villages of Dodanduwa, Rathgama, Katudampe and Berathuduwa.

It is located about 2 km (1.2 mi) from the coast, 105 km (65 mi) south of Colombo, and about 12 km (7.5 mi) north Galle. The lake is connected to the Indian Ocean at Dodanduwa. Following the construction of a fishing harbour at Dodanduwa in 2009, a sand bar has regularly formed at the mouth of the lagoon, during the dry seasons the river flow through the lagoon, originating from the lake, is not strong enough to flush incoming sediment out and requires manual breeching. The sandbar also restricts saltwater intrusion into the lagoon.

Fringing mangroves exist along the lagoon edge and in tiny islets. These mangrove areas are under threat from expansion of coconut cultivation and paddy rice fields. Twenty three species of mangrove trees and shrubs have been recorded, including Rhizophora mucronata, Avicennia marina, Excoecaria agallocha, Acanthus ilicifolius, Lumnitzera racemosa, Sonneratia caseolaris, Bruguiera gymnorhiza and Aegiceras corniculatum.

The natural fisheries production of the Ratgama lake was estimated in 1959 to be 20.7 kg/ha (18.5 lb/acre) per annum.

There are four islands located on the lake: Polgasduwa, Matiduwa, Mahaduwa and Parappuduwa. Located on Pogasduwa (coconut island) and Metiduwa is the Island Hermitage, a Theravāda Buddhist forest monastery founded by Ven. Nyanatiloka Mahathera in 1911. Parappuduwa was the site of a Buddhist nun's monastery, which was established in 1984 by Ayya Khema (1923-1997) the first Western woman to become a Theravadin Buddhist nun, closing in 1987. It was abandoned for twenty years, before being re-occupied by Buddhist monks.
