= Sister Uppalavanna =

German Buddhist nun

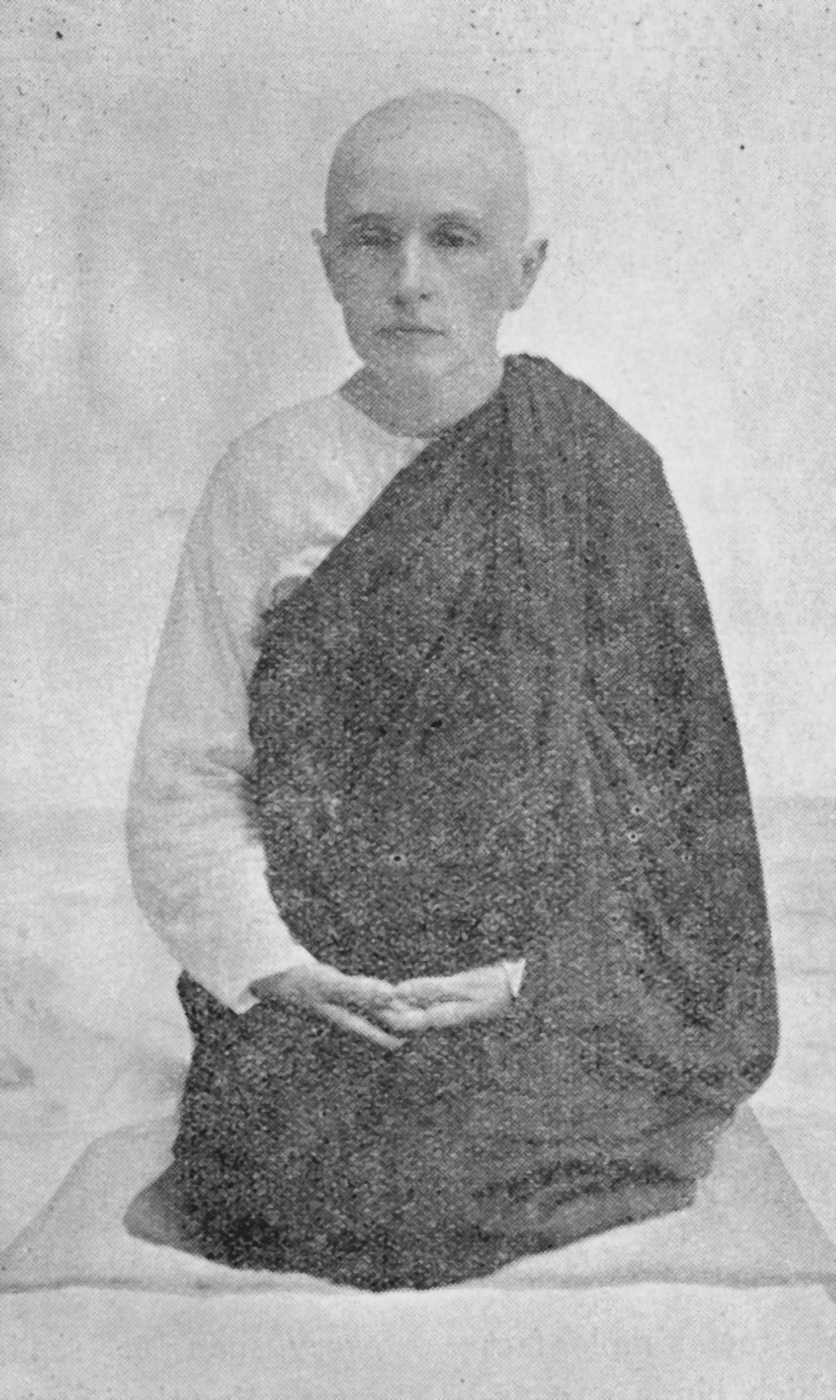

Personal life
- Born: Else Buchholtz; 11 February 1886 Hamburg, Germany
- Died: 1982 (aged 95–96) Mallika Nivasa, Colombo, Sri Lanka
- Occupation: Musician (Violinist)

Religious life
- Religion: Buddhism
- School: Theravada

Sister Uppalavannā (Else Buchholtz) was a German violinist who converted to Buddhism, becoming the first European Buddhist nun since the time of Greco-Buddhism. She lived as an ascetic in Sri Lanka from 1926 until her death.

== Early life ==
Else Buchholtz was born in Hamburg in 1886. Both her parents died in a Cholera epidemic soon after.

Adopted by wealthy foster parents, she was brought up in the Tiergarten quarter of Berlin. She led a carefree life, with all the comforts of German high society, and music, singing, dancing and horseback riding were an important part of her upbringing. She was proficient in the violin and possessed a trained musical voice.

In 1912, her foster parents also died and she inherited a considerable fortune from them. She moved to Odenwald, in the Schwarzwald. Here she found many poor and needy people, whom she helped financially. The loss of her parents and foster parents caused her to question the concept of the All Merciful God. She immersed herself in philosophical works and became interested in the philosophy of Buddhism. Amidst the chaos and destruction of the First World War she taught herself Meditation.

In 1919, she gave shelter at her home to two German Buddhist monks, Ven Nyanatiloka (the first non-British European to become a Buddhist monk) and Ven Vappa. The former, before his ordination, had been a violinist. Their common musical background helped bring about her conversion to Buddhism.

Buchholtz determined to go to Sri Lanka to renounce worldly desires, since she felt that the country's Buddhism represented the original teachings of the Buddha. In 1920, she paid for the passage of the two monks and herself to the island. However, the country was still a British colony and the three were denied entry as enemy aliens.

They therefore decided to go to Japan. Here Buchholtz studied Mahayana Buddhism for five years. In 1926, she went once again to Sri Lanka and was this time allowed to enter. She was befriended by Marie Musaeus Higgins, a German Educationalist and founder of Musaeus College a school for Buddhist girls, who gave her help and encouragement.

On 20 May 1926 Buchholtz was ordained a Buddhist nun beside the Jaya Sri Maha Bodhi (the tree that grew from a sapling of the Bo Tree under which the Buddha attained Enlightenment) at Anuradhapura, probably by Ven. Nyanatiloka. It may have been her beautiful blue eyes which inspired her teacher to name her after Uppalavanna ("blue lotus").

== Life as a nun ==
At first Sister Uppalavanna lived in a small thatched hut close to the Vajirarama monastery in Colombo and later in Weligama. After this she moved to a simple hermitage above the town of Gampola, in the cooler hill country. In 1938 she was invited by the Lay Committee of the Vihara Maha Devi Upasikaramaya nunnery to be chief nun. However she declined, preferring her 'little hut of palm-leaf matting' to the 'lax life of the ordinary nun's cloister'.

A group of benefactors, prominent amongst whom were Mrs. H.M. Gunasekera, Mrs. Nalin Moonesinghe, Lady A.M. de Silva, Mr. William Samarasinghe, Mr. H. W. Amarasuriya and Sir Lalita Rajapakse saw to her meagre needs. During the early 1950s she spent the 'vassa' or rainy seasons at the Watawala Estate bungalow with Anil and Jeanne Moonesinghe.

Sister Uppalavanna kept strictly to the Buddhist discipline (vinaya), observing all ten of the Buddhist precepts, (unlike most nuns, who observe only eight) in addition to the 311 rules for ordained nuns. She would cease eating lunch at midday precisely and would accept no food after that hour.

Mr Gilbert, a Kandy businessman converted a rock cave called Manapadassana-lena (Cave of Pleasant View) into a habitable dwelling, which was to be her final hermitage, to reach which she had to climb 98 steps. On being informed through German diplomatic sources that she was left with a fabulous fortune in her native land, she replied 'Please do not trouble me with such information. I have no desire for anything worldly, I am striving for emancipation from greed, hatred and delusion.'

When she was 94, in failing health, she was persuaded to move to the Mallika Home for the Aged, an institution established by Mallika Hewavitharana (wife of Don Carolis Hewavitharana). She died there, peacefully, two years later.
