= Theodor Schultze =

German civil servant and writer (1824–1898)

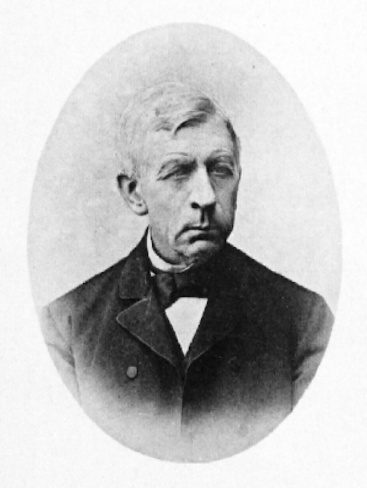
- Theodor Schultze, c. 1880s
- Born: June 22, 1822; Oldenburg in Holstein, Holstein
- Died: April 6, 1898 (aged 75); Potsdam, German Empire
- Occupations: Civil servant, writer

Theodor Schultze (22 June 1824 – 6 April 1898) was a German civil servant, translator, and religious writer. Serving in various civil service posts across northern Germany, he began to produce pro-Christian religious writings in 1862. He wrote in support of Buddhism after producing a German translation of the Dhammapada in 1885, praising its asceticism as a means to strengthen individual self-control and willpower. He later condemned Christianity from both moral and antisemitic perspectives, describing it as Jewish in influence and declaring Buddhism the "religion of the future" for Europe.

== Biography ==
Theodor Schultze was born in Oldenburg in Holstein on 22 June 1824. His father was a pharmacist, and his mother was a staunchly religious Protestant. His friend Arthur Pfungst described him as following the values of duty and self-discipline instilled in him by his mother, refusing alcohol and working on Sundays. He attended Gymnasium (secondary school) in Lubeck, graduating in 1842, and studied law at Kiel University, where he joined a Burschenschaft fraternity. After passing his examinations, the university president reportedly remarked to Schultze that he should not "think too highly of his talents and knowledge", sending him into a "deep melancholy" for several years.

In 1848, Schultze became a junior lawyer at the Schleswig Landesgericht (district court). The 1864 Second Schleswig War resulted in Prussia's annexation of the Duchy of Holstein and Duchy of Schleswig, previously under Danish rule. According to Pfungst, he felt that he could not take a position in the Prussian civil service while still having taken an oath to the Danish king. He traveled to Denmark to confirm his release from the oath, resulting in his dismissal by the Prussian government.

Schultze briefly entered civil service in the Grand Duchy of Oldenburg before returning to Prussia and gaining a post as a councilor in Kiel in 1866. He moved to Potsdam in 1868 and remained in service there until 1888, when he retired due to a long illness.

=== Religious thought and death ===
In 1862, Schultze produced a self-published religious text, exalting Protestant principles. He described all people alive as being at fault for the crucifixion of Jesus due to their sins, writing that spiritual bliss can only come from an individual following God's "law without doubt and qualms". Over the following decades, he grew disillusioned with Christianity, seeing it as having been uprooted by modern science and philosophy and unable to reform. He produced a German translation of the Dhammapada, a prominent Buddhist holy text, in 1885. In his introduction, he describes searching for metaphysical ideas outside Christianity, and discusses the works of the Orientalist scholar Max Müller and the philosopher Arthur Schopenhauer. He writes that Buddhism allows an individual to strengthen their self-control and willpower, writing that the Buddha's "asceticism aims to achieve complete self-governance of the will over those motives rooted in the domain of sensuality".

Schultze described his disillusionment with Christianity in an 1891 book, Das Christentum Christi ("The Christianity of the Christ"). He criticizes Christianity as having failed to uplift the oppressed, noting a lack of anti-slavery sentiment in the Bible and the emergence of chattel slavery under Christian states during the colonization of the Americas. Also describing Christianity as failing to free women from patriarchy, he writes that Christianity ultimately follows the dominant socioeconomic forces and accepts any social or political doctrine which increases its own power.

In an 1892 book titled Das rollende Rad des Lebens und der feste Ruhestand ("The Rolling Wheel of Life and Firm Repose"), Schultze expands on his criticisms of Christianity. Both of these books were later collected into a single work published in two volumes. He embraces antisemitic views, writing that "we are much more 'semitized' and especially 'judaized' through Christianity than we are conscious of, or that we are willing to admit". He makes no mentions of class in his description of Europe's many social ills, instead calling for a spiritual revolution to overturn the inequalities and injustice of the preceding system.

Schultze described Semitic people as incapable of introspection, unlike the Aryan race. He advocated for Buddhism, a purportedly Aryan religion, as a means to combat Christianity. Schultze came to see Christianity as a vehicle for Jewish influence over Europe, and a cause of moral decline. He described Buddhism as the "religion of the future", believing that it would lead to the "future regeneration of religious consciousness within the European cultural sphere". This conception of Buddhism as the "religion of the future" was echoed in the following years by German writers such as Karl Bleibtreu, Carl von Thomassin, and Anton Weis-Ulmenried.

Shortly before his death, he produced a German translation of the philosopher John Locke's 1689 An Essay Concerning Human Understanding. The book was published posthumously. Schultze died of esophageal cancer in Potsdam on 6 April 1898. According to Pfungst, he wrote in his will that he should be buried without a tombstone, clergy, or any announcement of a funeral.

== Bibliography ==
=== As writer ===
- Schultze, Thedodor (1887). Berichtigungen zu Dr. Franz Mischeis deutscher Uebersetzung von Anquetil Duperron's Oupnek'hat [Corrections to Dr. Franz Mischeis' German Translation of Anquetil-Duperron's Translation of the Buddhacharita] (in German). Dresden: E. Heinrich.
- — (1891). Das Christenthum Christi und die Religion der Liebe; ein Votum in Sachen der Zukunftsreligion [The Christianity of Christ and the Religion of Love; a Vote on the Matter of Future Religion] (in German). Leipzig: Wilhelm Friedrich.
- — (1892). Das Roilende Rad des Lebens und der feste Ruhestand [The Rolling Wheel of Life and Firm Repose] (in German). Leipzig: Wilhelm Friedrich.

=== As translator ===
- Schultze, Thedodor (1885). Das Dhammapada (in German). Leipzig: Otto Schulze.
- —. Buddhas Leben und Wirken [The Life and Work of Buddha] (in German). Leipzig: Philipp Reclam jun.
- — (1898). Ueber den Menschlichen Verstand: Eine Abhandlung von John Locke [An Essay Concerning Human Understanding by John Locke] (in German). Leipzig: Philipp Reclam jun.
