= Buddhist Global Relief =

Buddhist charitable organisation

Buddhist Global Relief is an organization of socially engaged Buddhists with a mission to "combat chronic hunger and malnutrition". It was founded by Bhikkhu Bodhi in 2008.

== History ==
When the 2004 Indian Ocean earthquake and tsunami happened, Bhikkhu Bodhi was moved to action. He soon raised $160,000 with many dharma friends, and when looking for charitable relief organizations, he found a dearth of Buddhist organizations. Three years later, Bodhi wrote an article in Buddhadharma: The Practitioner's Quarterly titled "A Challenge to Buddhists", which urged American Buddhists to be more socially engaged.

Bodhi and some of his students formally established Buddhist Global Relief in June 2008, registered in New Jersey.

== Programs ==
BGR works to create long-term solutions to poverty and hunger and to improve women's education and economic power worldwide.

BGR has partnered with Helen Keller International to provide sufficient micronutrients to people in Niger and Mali. Since 2009, it has partnered with Lotus Outreach to create "Food Scholarships for Girls to Stay in School" in Cambodia. BGR was one of the 40 groups that pledged to work with "Tomorrow Together", a coalition created to promote a five-year initiative to encourage unity, empathy, and service each year on 9/11, through to the 20th anniversary of 9/11 in 2021.

After the April 2015 Nepal earthquake, BGR made an emergency donation of $10,000, which was distributed among five charities: UNICEF, CARE, Direct Relief, Oxfam America, and the International Medical Corps.

BGR was one of many organizations that attempted to aid Syrian Refugees. As of December 2015, it had donated $12,000 to be split among six charitable causes.

In Myanmar, BGR works with Insight Myanmar to offer essential food and supplies to Buddhist monastics and people of all faiths. BGR also supports the education of 38 young women in Afghanistan through CARE.

BGR also partners with the Center for Indigenous Work (CTI) in Brazil to protect Indigenous land rights and traditional cultures, and it aids malnourished pregnant women in Sri Lanka through the Shraddha Charity Organization.

BGR collaborates with organizations like the Capital Area Food Bank to deliver over 50 million meals annually to those in need in Washington, D.C.

To raise funds for its programs, BGR holds annual "Walks to Feed the Hungry" in cities across the United States.
