= Nyanaponika Thera =

Sri Lankan Theravada Buddhist monk and scholar (1901–1994)

Nyanaponika Maha Thera
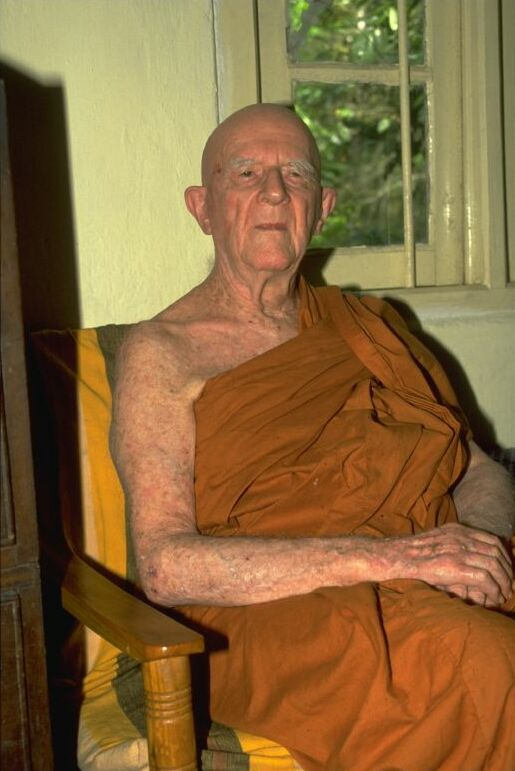
- Title: Mahathera (Great Elder)

Personal life
- Born: Siegmund Feniger; July 21, 1901 Hanau, German Empire
- Died: October 19, 1994 (aged 93) Forest Hermitage, Kandy, Sri Lanka
- Occupation: monk; co-founder, Buddhist Publication Society

Religious life
- Religion: Theravada Buddhism

Senior posting
- Based in: Forest Hermitage
- Predecessor: U Nārada
- Successor: Bhikkhu Bodhi (at BPS)

Nyanaponika Thera or Nyanaponika Mahathera (July 21, 1901 – 19 October 1994) was a German–Sri Lankan Theravada Buddhist monk and scholar who, after ordaining in Sri Lanka, later became the co-founder of the Buddhist Publication Society and author of numerous seminal books and articles on Theravada Buddhism. He mentored and taught a whole generation of Western Buddhist leaders such as Bhikkhu Bodhi.

== Early life ==
Nyanaponika Thera was born in Hanau, Germany on July 21, 1901, as Siegmund Feniger, the only child of a Jewish family.

In 1921, he moved with his parents to Berlin, where he met with German Buddhists and had access to Buddhist literature in the German language. He came across the writings of Ven. Nyanatiloka Mahathera (1878–1957), the former German violin virtuoso Anton Gueth. Young Siegmund had learned that Ven. Nyanatiloka Thera had established a monastery for Western monks in Sri Lanka, on an island lagoon (opposite the Railway station) Polgasduwa, Dodanduwa named Island Hermitage. This news stirred his conscience to go to Asia and become a Buddhist monk.

However, circumstances prevented him from acting on this plan for quite some time. In 1932 his father died, and he did not wish to leave his widowed mother in the lurch. Then, Adolf Hitler came to power in Germany. In November 1935 he and his mother left Germany and moved to Vienna, where they had relatives.

== Move to Sri Lanka and imprisonment ==
Having arranged for his mother to stay in Vienna, in early 1936 he finally was able to leave Europe for Sri Lanka, where he joined Ven. Nyanatiloka Thera at the Island Hermitage.

After several months of studies, in June 1936 he was ordained as a novice and was given the name Nyanaponika. In 1937 he received Upasampadā (Higher Ordination) under the tutelage of Nyanatiloka Mahathera.

In 1939, after the Nazis invaded Poland, Ven. Nyanaponika Thera arranged for his mother and other relatives to move to Sri Lanka. Through the influence of her son and the generous hosts, she embraced Buddha Dhamma and became a devoted Buddhist. She died in Colombo in 1956.

When World War II broke out in 1939, the British Government had all German males resident in their colonies consigned to concentration camps, suspecting them to be German spies. Nyanaponika's and Nyanatiloka's internment was first at Diyatalawa Army Cantonment in Sri Lanka, and later at Dehra Dun in northern India.

Despite these experiences as a prisoner of war, during this period Ven. Nyanaponika Thera completed German translations of the Sutta Nipata, the Dhammasangani (the first book of the Abhidhamma Pitaka), and its commentary. He compiled an anthology of texts on Satipatthana Meditation. This work was begun at Diyatalawa, and it was finished while he was interned at Dehra Dun.

== Career ==
With the cessation of war, the two bhikkhus were released from internment at Dehra Dun. They returned to Sri Lanka in 1946 and resided at the Island Hermitage, Dodanduwa. In early 1951 Sri Lanka granted citizenship to both of them.

With advancing age Ven. Nyanatiloka Mahathera wished to leave the hot and stuffy sea-coast climate of Dodanduwa, and in 1946 he was offered a hermitage in the Udawattekelle Forest Reserve in Kandy, which has a cooler climate. The following year Ven. Nyanaponika Thera joined him at the new Kandy Hermitage.

In 1952, both Venerable Nyanatiloka Mahathera and Nyanaponika Thera were invited by the Burmese (Myanmar) Government to be consultants to the Sixth Buddhist Council, to be convened in 1954 to re-edit and reprint the entire Pali Canon and its commentaries. After their work with the council was completed, Ven. Nyanaponika Thera stayed in Burma for a period of training in Vipassanā (Insight Meditation) under the meditation teacher Ven. Mahasi Sayadaw Thera.

The experience he gathered motivated him to write his best-known work, The Heart of Buddhist Meditation, published by the Buddhist Publication Society. This work was reprinted in many editions, and was translated into more languages.

In 1954, the teacher and the pupil returned to Burma for the opening ceremonies of the Sixth Buddhist Council, which was held in a cave-like structure built similar to the Sattaprani Caves in Rajagaha (Rajgir), India, where the First Buddhist Council had been held. For the closing ceremonies in 1956 Ven. Nyanaponika Thera went to Burma alone, as his teacher Nyanatiloka Mahathera was indisposed at that time.

In 1957, the health of Ven. Nyanatiloka Mahathera deteriorated, and he moved to Colombo for easy and ready medical attention. On May 28, 1957, the great pioneering scholar monk died, and he was accorded a State Funeral at Independence Square, Colombo, attended by the Prime Minister S.W.R.D. Bandaranaike, many State officials, and both the laity and religious dignitaries and prelates of all Nikayas.

His ashes were enshrined at the Polgasduwa Island Hermitage, Dodanduwa, and a tombstone was built to perpetuate his memory. Ven. Nyanaponika Thera, thereafter dutifully honoring the request of his teacher, revised Ven. Nyanatiloka Mahathera's German translation of the complete Anguttara Nikaya, retyping the five volumes in full by himself, and also compiling a forty-page Index to the work.

Six months after the death of his teacher, the career of Ven. Nyanaponika Thera was to be launched in a new direction, a permanent contribution to the spread of Buddhism worldwide. A.S. Karunaratne (a prominent lawyer in Kandy, who was Mayor of Kandy in 1945) suggested to his friend Richard Abeysekera (d. August 1982) (Trinity College teacher in retirement), that they start a society for the publication of Buddhist literature in English, mainly to be distributed abroad. The unanimous decision was that Ven. Nyanaponika Thera, in the Udawattekelle Forest Reserve Aramaya, would be the best director of the institution. Thus, on January 1, 1958, the Buddhist Publication Society (BPS) was born.

Devoting his time and energy to the publications of the BPS, Nyanaponika Thera wrote tracts, encouraged others to write, collated and translated suttas, and had them published. In addition to his own writings, 200 Wheel titles and 100 Bodhi Leaves (booklets) - authored by numerous scholars - were issued during his editorship at the BPS.

Ven. Nyanaponika Thera's biography is completely submerged in his writings. With advancing age having a heavy toll on his strength, in 1984 he retired as editor of BPS, and in 1988 he retired as president, ending his career there with recognition as a Distinguished Patron of BPS. His fame as an exponent of authentic Theravada Buddhism reached all corners of the globe.

In 1978, the German Oriental Society appointed him an honorary member, in recognition of his combination of objective scholarship with religious practice as a Buddhist monk. In 1987, the Buddhist and Pali University of Sri Lanka at its first convocation, conferred on him its first ever Honoris Causa Degree of Doctor of Literature.

In 1990, he received the Honoris Causa Degree of Doctor of Letters from the University of Peradeniya. In 1993, The Amarapura Maha Sangha Sabha, to which he belonged for 56 years, conferred on him the honorary title of Amarapura Maha Mahopadhyaya Sasana Sobhana (The Great Mentor of the Amarapura Maha Sasana Sabha, Ornament of Teaching).

His last birthday (which fell on July 21, 1994) was celebrated by his friends and the BPS staff with the release of the BPS edition of his book The Vision of Dhamma, a collection of his writings from the Wheel and Bodhi Leaves series. On October 19, 1994, the last day of his 58th Rains Retreat as a bhikkhu, he died in the pre-dawn quietude of the Udawattekelle forest hermitage.

== Selected publications ==
- Thera, Nyanaponika (1981). The Greater Discourse on the Elephant's Footprint: Mahahatthipadopama Sutta (MN 28). Buddhist Publication Society.
- Thera, Nyanaponika (1987). The Life of Sariputta compiled and translated from the Pali texts. Buddhist Publication Society.
- Thera, Nyanaponika (1998). Abhidhamma Studies: Buddhist Explorations of Consciousness and Time. Wisdom Publications. ISBN 978-0861711352.
- Thera, Nyanaponika (2000). The Vision of Dhamma: Buddhist Writings of Nyanaponika Thera. Pariyatti. ISBN 978-1928706038.
- Thera, Nyanaponika; Bodhi, Bhikkhu (2000). Numerical Discourses of the Buddha. Yale University Press. ISBN 978-0300165203.
- Thera, Nyanaponika (2001). The Power of Mindfulness (PDF).
- Thera, Nyanaponika (2003). Great Disciples of the Buddha : Their Lives, Their Works, Their Legacy. Wisdom Publications. ISBN 978-0861713813.
- Thera, Nyanaponika (2014). The Heart of Buddhist Meditation. Weiser Books. ISBN 978-1578635580.

=== Wheel Publications (BPS) ===
- Anatta and Nibbana: Egolessness and Deliverance (WH011)
- Devotion In Buddhism: Three essays (WH018)
- Advice To Rahula: Four Discourses of the Buddha (WH033)
- Buddhism and The God Idea (WH047)
- Taming The Mind: Discourses of the Buddha (WH051)
- German Buddhist Writers (WH074/075)
- City of the Mind: And other writings (WH205)
- Kamma and its Fruit: Selected Essays (WH221/224)
- Contemplation of Feelings (WH303/304)

=== Bodhi Leaf Publications (BPS) ===
- Protection Through Satipatthana (BL34)
