= Paul Hacker (Indologist) =

German academic (1913–1979)

Paul Hacker (6 January 1913 – 18 March 1979) was a German Indologist, whose academic research focused on the study of Indian philosophy, especially Advaita Vedānta, the Purāṇas and the Hindi language.

== Publications ==
- Hacker, Paul (1978), Kleine Schriften. Edited by Lambert Schmithausen. Wiesbaden: Franz Steiner.
- Hacker, Paul (1965), Dharma in Hinduism
- Hacker, Paul (1970), Aspects of Neo-Hinduism as Contrasted with Surviving Traditional Hinduism
- Hacker, Paul (1995), Philology and Confrontation: Paul Hacker on Traditional and Modern Vedanta, SUNY

== Sources ==
- Halbfass, Wilhelm (1995), "Introduction. An Uncommon Orientalist: Paul Hacker's Passage to India" (PDF), Philology and Confrontation: Paul Hacker on Traditional and Modern Vedanta, SUNY
