= Bhikkhu Bodhi =

American Buddhist monk and scholar (born 1944)

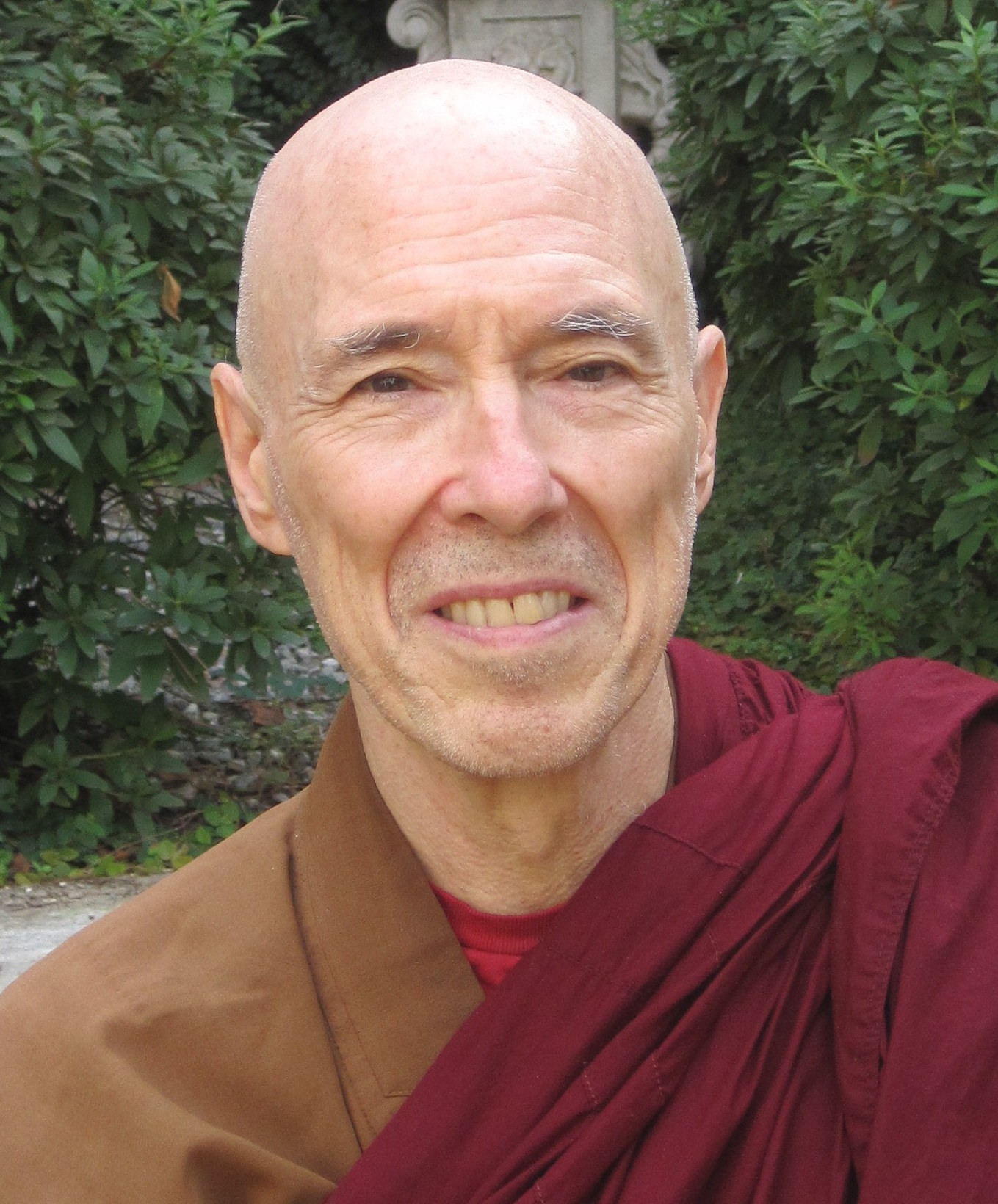
- Title: President of the Buddhist Association of the United States, Founder of Buddhist Global Relief, President of the Buddhist Publication Society

Personal life
- Born: Jeffrey Block; December 10, 1944 (age 81) Brooklyn, New York City, United States
- Education: Brooklyn College; Claremont Graduate University
- Occupation: scholar-monk

Religious life
- Religion: Buddhism
- School: Theravada

Senior posting
- Teacher: Ven. Ananda Maitreya
- Based in: Chuang Yen Monastery; Buddhist Publication Society; Sangha Council of Bodhi Monastery
- Predecessor: Ven. Nyanaponika Thera (BPS editor and president)
- Successor: Mr. Kariyavasam (BPS editor), P.D. Premasiri (BPS president) Buddhist Publication Society

Jeffrey Block (born December 10, 1944), better known as Bhikkhu Bodhi, (Note: Chinese: 菩提比丘; pinyin: Pútí bǐqiū, Pali: भिक्खु बोधि) is an American Theravāda monk ordained in Sri Lanka who teaches in the area of New York and New Jersey. He is an author and Buddhist commentator and was appointed the second president of the Buddhist Publication Society. He is also the president of the Buddhist Association of America and the founder of Buddhist Global Relief.

== Early life ==
Jeffrey Block was born in 1944 in Brooklyn, New York, to Jewish parents. He grew up in Borough Park, where he attended elementary school P.S. 160 and graduated from New Utrecht High School. He then worked as a door-to-door salesman selling paintbrushes. In 1966, he obtained a B.A. in philosophy from Brooklyn College, where he first encountered Buddhism in books at the bookstore. In 1972, he obtained a PhD in philosophy from Claremont Graduate University.

== Career ==
In early 1967, while still a graduate student, Block met and moved in with a monk named Thich Giac Duc. In May 1967, he was ordained as a sāmaṇera (novice) in the Vietnamese Mahāyāna order. In 1971 and 1972, after graduating, he lived at a meditation center in Los Angeles, where he was introduced to a group of Theravāda monks from Sri Lanka. This inspired him to travel to Sri Lanka, where, under Balangoda Ananda Maitreya Thero, he received sāmaṇera ordination in the Theravāda Order and in 1973 received full ordination (upasampadā) as a Theravāda bhikkhu or monk. After that, Bhikkhu Bodhi became particularly interested in the scholarly, textual side of monastic life, and studied many Pali texts under Balangoda Ananda Maitreya Thero.

In 1984, succeeding co-founder Nyanaponika Thera, Bhikkhu Bodhi was appointed English-language editor of the Buddhist Publication Society (BPS, Sri Lanka). He became its president in 1988. In 2002, he retired from the society's editorship while still remaining president.

In 2000, at the United Nations' first official Vesak celebration, Bhikkhu Bodhi gave the keynote address. In 2002, after retiring as editor of BPS, he returned to the U.S. He lived at Bodhi Monastery in Lafayette Township, New Jersey, and now lives and teaches at Chuang Yen Monastery in Carmel, New York. Since 2013 he has been the president of the Buddhist Association of the United States. In 2019 he again took part in the UN Vesak celebration, giving a speech that included a call to action on climate change.

In 2007, Bhikkhu Bodhi founded the organization Buddhist Global Relief. This was inspired by an essay he had written, "A Challenge to Buddhists", published in the Buddhist magazine Buddhadharma. Buddhist Global Relief funds projects to fight hunger and empower women across the world.

== Personal life ==
After returning to the United States, Bodhi became a vegetarian.

== Selected publications ==
- Bodhi, Bhikkhu (1989). The Discourse on the Fruit of Recluseship (The Samaññaphala Sutta and Its Commentaries). Buddhist Publication Society. ISBN 978-955-24-0045-2.
- Bodhi, Bhikkhu; Bhikkhu, Ñāṇamoli (1995). The Middle Length Discourses of the Buddha: A Translation of the Majjhima Nikaya. Wisdom Publications. ISBN 978-0-86171-072-0.
- Bodhi, Bhikkhu (1998). Great Discourse on Causation: Mahanidana Sutta and Its Commentaries. Buddhist Publication Society. ISBN 978-955-24-0117-6.
- Bodhi, Bhikkhu; Thera, Nyanaponika (2000). Numerical Discourses of the Buddha: An Anthology of Suttas from the Anguttara Nikaya. Altamira Press. ISBN 978-0-7425-0405-9.
- Bodhi, Bhikkhu (2000). The Connected Discourses of the Buddha: A New Translation of the Samyutta Nikaya. Wisdom Publications. ISBN 978-0-86171-331-8.
- Bodhi, Bhikkhu (2000). The Buddha and His Message: Past, Present & Future (United Nations Vesak Day Lecture). Buddhist Publication Society. ISBN 978-955-24-0346-0.
- Bodhi, Bhikkhu (2000). A Comprehensive Manual of Abhidhamma: The Abhidhammattha Sangaha of Ācariya Anuruddha. Pariyatti. ISBN 978-1-928706-02-1.
- Bodhi, Bhikkhu (2001). The Buddha and His Dhamma. Buddhist Publication Society. ISBN 978-955-24-0201-2.
- Bodhi, Bhikkhu (2005). In the Buddha's Words: An Anthology of Discourses from the Pali Canon. Wisdom Publications. ISBN 978-0-86171-491-9.
- Bodhi, Bhikkhu (2006). The Noble Eightfold Path: Way to the End of Suffering (3rd ed.). Pariyatti. ISBN 978-1-928706-07-6.
- Bodhi, Bhikkhu (2007). The Discourse on the All-Embracing Net of Views: The Brahmajala Sutta Commentarial Exegesis (2nd ed.). Buddhist Publication Society. ISBN 978-955-24-0052-0.
- Bodhi, Bhikkhu (2007). "A Challenge to Buddhists". Lion’s Roar. https://www.lionsroar.com/a-challenge-to-buddhists/
- Bodhi, Bhikkhu (2009). The Revival of Bhikkhuni Ordination in the Theravada Tradition. Inward Path. ISBN 978-983-3512-63-8
- Bodhi, Bhikkhu (2012). The Numerical Discourses of the Buddha: A Translation of the Anguttara Nikaya. Wisdom Publications. ISBN 978-1-61429-040-7.
- Bodhi, Bhikkhu (2016). The Buddha's Teachings on Social and Communal Harmony: An Anthology of Discourses from the Pali Canon. Wisdom Publications. ISBN 978-1-61429-355-2.
- Bodhi, Bhikkhu (2016). The Discourse on the Root of Existence: The Mulapariyaya Sutta and its Commentaries (3rd ed.). Buddhist Publication Society. ISBN 978-955-24-0064-3.
- Bodhi, Bhikkhu (2017). The Suttanipata: An Ancient Collection of the Buddha's Discourses and Its Canonical Commentaries. Wisdom Publications. ISBN 978-1-61429-429-0.
- Bodhi, Bhikkhu (2017). Investigating the Dhamma: A Collection of Papers. Pariyatti. ISBN 978-1-68172-068-5.
- Bodhi, Bhikkhu (2017). Dhamma Reflections: Collected Essays of Bhikkhu Bodhi. Pariyatti. ISBN 978-1-68172-032-6.
- Bodhi, Bhikkhu (2020). Reading the Buddha's Discourses in Pali: A Practical Guide to the Language of the Ancient Buddhist Canon. Wisdom Publications. ISBN 978-1-61429-700-0.
- Bodhi, Bhikkhu (2023), Noble Truths, Noble Path: The Heart Essence of the Buddha's Original Teachings. Wisdom Publications.

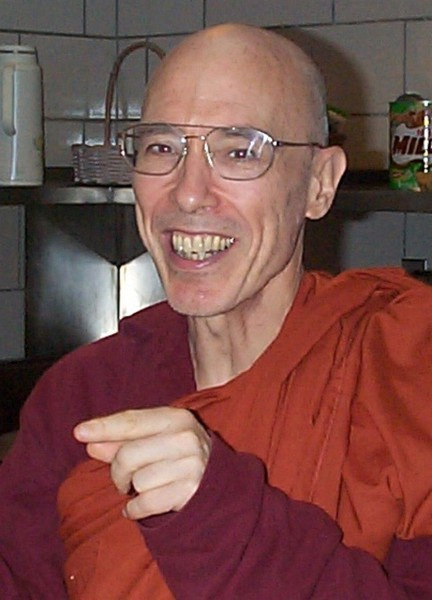
A young Bhikkhu Bodhi in 2003

=== Wheel Publications (BPS) ===
- Nourishing the Roots and Other Essays on Buddhist Ethics (WH259/260)
- Transcendental Dependent Arising (WH277/278)
- Going for Refuge; Taking the Precepts (WH282/284)
- Dana: The Practice of Giving (WH367/369)
- Maha Kaccana: Master of Doctrinal Exposition (WH405/406)
- Facing the Future: Four essays on the social relevance of Buddhism (WH438/440)

=== Bodhi Leaf Publications (BPS) ===
- Taste of Freedom (BL71)
- The Living Message of the Dhammapada (BL129)
- Discourses of the Ancient Nuns (BL143)
- The Good, the Beautiful, and the True (BL154)
