= Island Hermitage =

Forest monastery founded by Nyanatiloka in Sri Lanka

- පොල්ගස්දූව ආරණ්‍ය සේනාසනය
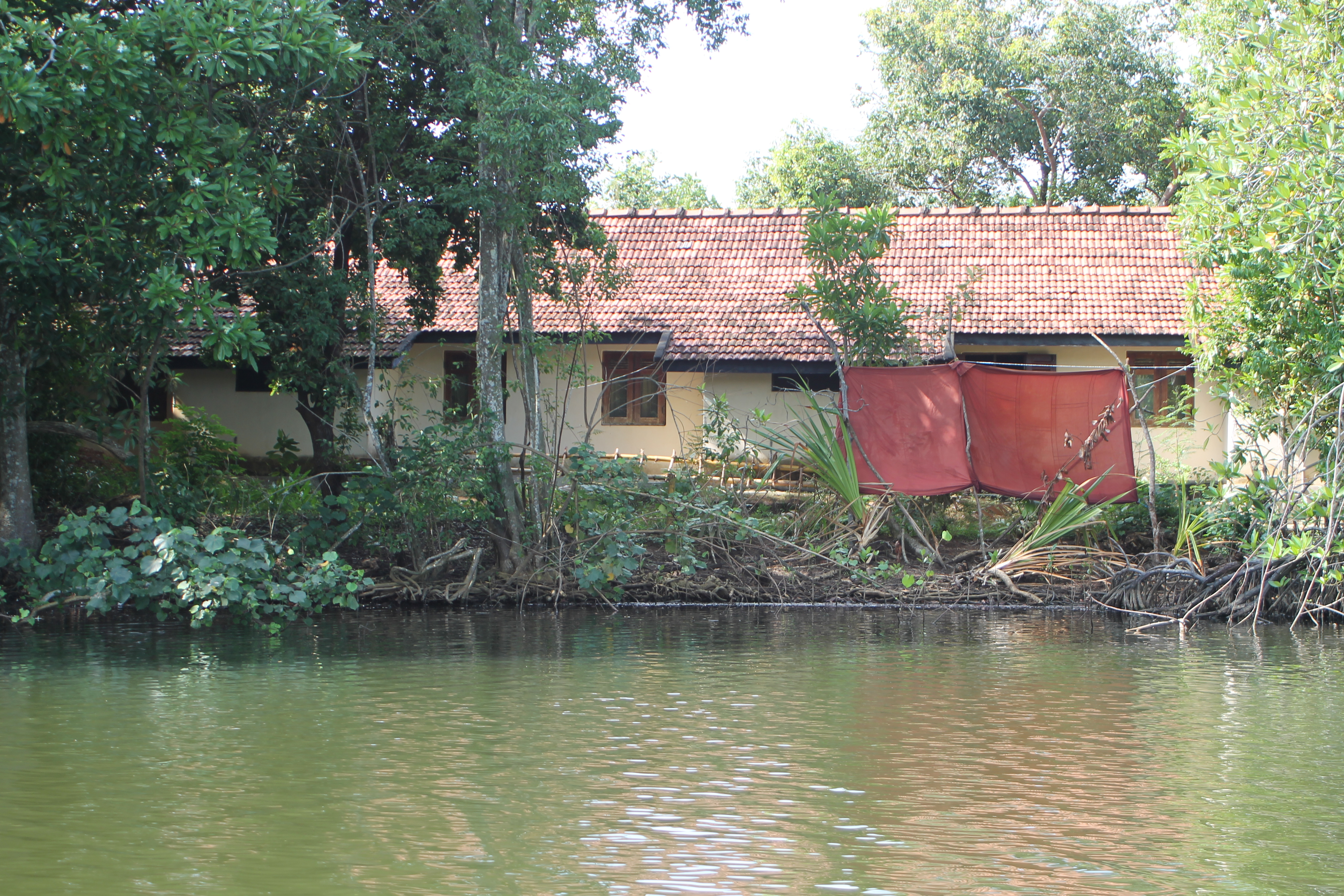

Religion
- Affiliation: Theravada

Location
- Location: Island Hermitage, Katudampe, Ratgama 80260
- Country: Sri Lanka
- Interactive map of Island Hermitage
- Coordinates: 6.108174°N 80.138224°E

Architecture
- Founder: Venerable Nyanatiloka Mahathera
- Completed: July 9, 1911

Island Hermitage on (Polgasduwa) Dodanduwa Island, Galle District, Sri Lanka is a famous Buddhist forest monastery founded by Ven Nyanatiloka Mahathera in 1911. It is a secluded place for Buddhist monks to study and meditate in the Theravada Buddhist tradition, and it contains an English and German library.

The Island Hermitage was the first centre of Theravāda Buddhist study and practice set up by and for Westerners. Its residents, monks and laymen, studied Theravada Buddhism and the Pali language, made translations of The Pali Canon, wrote books on Theravada Buddhism and practiced meditation. The Island Hermitage formed an essential link with Theravāda Buddhism in the West, a link which endures to the present day.

In 1951 Nyanatiloka moved to the Forest Hermitage in Kandy, then joined by Nyanaponika. Since 2003, the hermitage has been run by a group of young Sri Lankan monks.

== Location ==
The hermitage is located in Ratgama Lake, a salt-water lagoon about 2 km (1.2 mi) from the coast near Dodanduwa, 105 km (65 mi) south of Colombo, and about 12 km (7.5 mi) north Galle.

The Hermitage consists of two islands: Polgasduwa and Metiduwa (or Meddeduwa Sinhala: මැද්දෙදූව හෝ මැටිදූව). It is characterised by rich jungle vegetation and abundant bird, animal and reptile life. It is a peaceful place on an island in the large Bolgoda Lake, which is about 4.0 km (2.5 mi) across and brackish as it connects with the sea. The terrain of the island is mostly flat or slightly undulating. The highest point is about 5 m (16 ft) above sea level. On Metiduwa the vegetation consists of scrub and small trees such as cinnamon and bombu, with mangrove and palm trees growing along the water's edge. On the higher ground at Parapaduwa there are larger trees such as mahogany, mango and jak. There is a noisy breeding colony of egrets, night herons and cormorants and also a colony of flying foxes. There are many mongoose and monitor lizards on the islands.

Being situated an island in a lagoon, the climate is quite hot and humid, but a fully grown canopy layer of the forest provides a comfortable environment for the meditators.

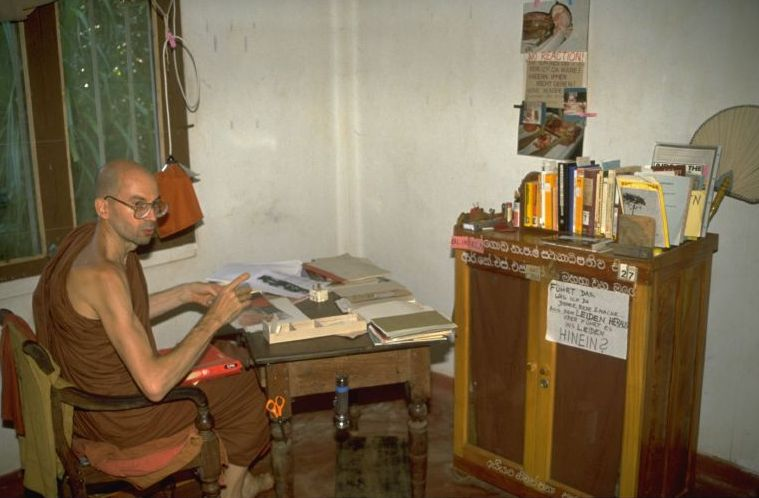
Bhikkhu Nyanasanta at Island Hermitage, (ca. 2006).

== History ==
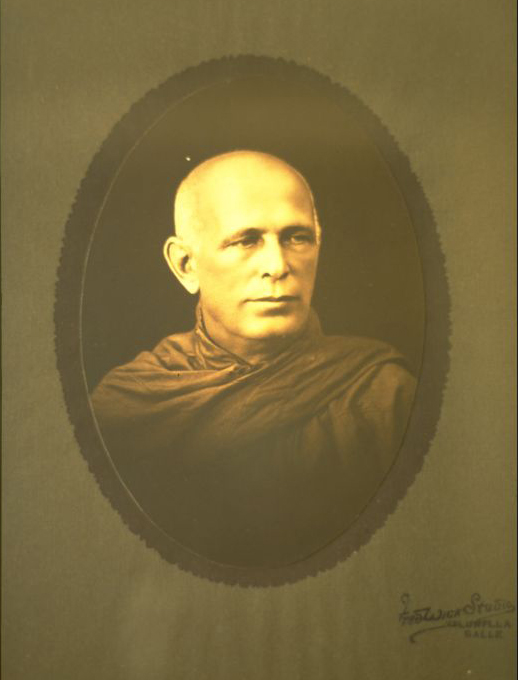
Nyanatiloka Maha Thera.

Among the early Western residents were the Venerables Vappo, Mahanama, Assaji and Bhaddiya. The founder dāyaka (lay disciple acolyte supporter) was William Mendis Wijesekera. He and other lay supporters from around Dodanduwa conveyed alms-food and other requisites to the hermitage by boat every morning. In 1913 a dānasāla (refectory) was constructed.

It was not until 1914 that the Island Polgasduwa actually came into the legal possession of the Sangha, when it was bought and donated by Ven. Nyanatiloka's Swiss supporter, Monsieur Bergier. Since that time, though interrupted by two world wars, Western as well as Sinhalese monks and laymen have lived, studied, practiced, and spread the Dhamma from the Island Hermitage.

At the outbreak of World War I in 1914, the German monks were first permitted to stay at the Island Hermitage under surveillance. However, after four months, they were taken into civil internment in Sri Lanka and then sent to Australia. When Ven. Nyanatiloka was finally able to return to Sri Lanka in 1926, he found his beloved Island Hermitage in utter ruin and had to rebuild it anew.

As soon as the restoration was completed and the hermitage was making progress again, the Second World War broke out in 1939. Ven. Nyanatiloka and his German disciples were again interned in camps, first in Sri Lanka and then in India. They were allowed to return in 1946. This time the Hermitage remained in a well preserved and in an even improved condition. It now included the adjacent small island of Metiduwa which had already been used for some time but was now officially donated by Lady Evadne de Silva, a long-time supporter of Ven. Nyanatiloka.

A detailed account of the history of the Island Hermitage and the monks who lived on it can be found in The Life of Nyanatiloka Thera: The Biography of a Western Buddhist Pioneer, Bhikkhu Nyanatusita & Hellmuth Hecker, Kandy 2008.

== Chapter house ==
The chapter house (Sīmā) which is built on lake is the place where the community of monks, particularly gather to listen Pāṭimokkha recitation on a fortnightly basis as well as to perform other monastic procedures as the need arises.

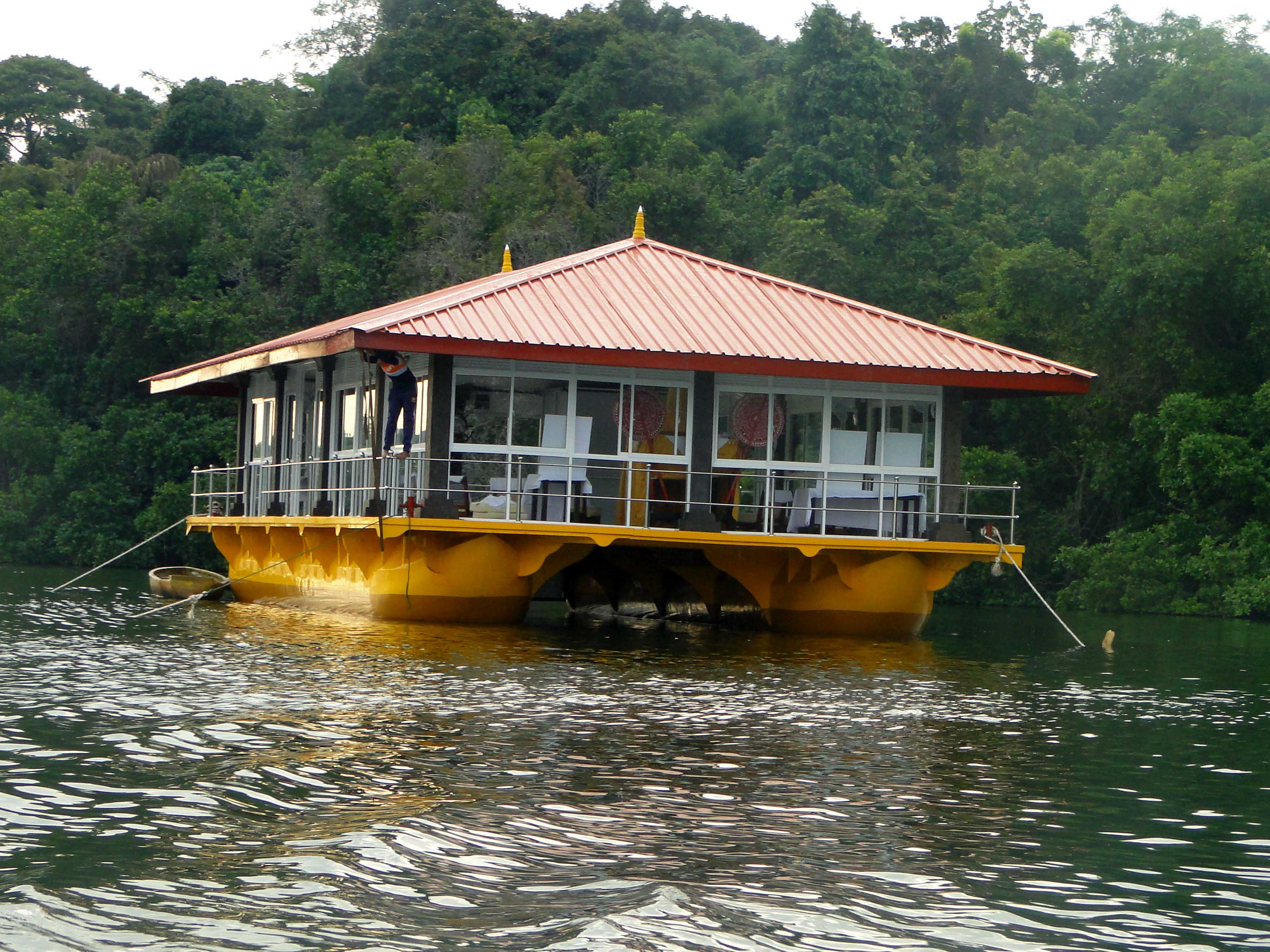
Chapter hall at Island Hermitage

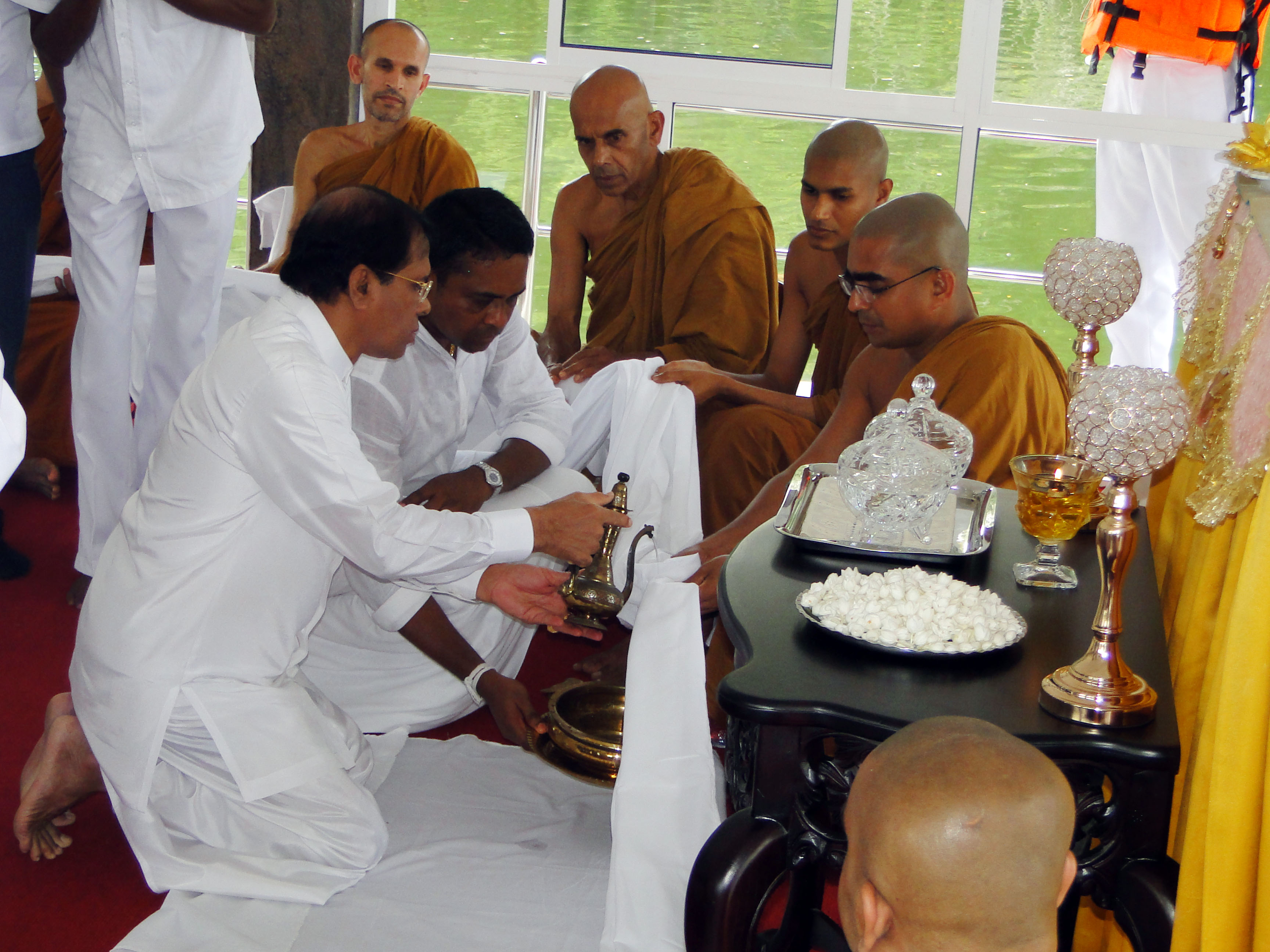
Inauguration of the newly built Sīmā or Chapter hall at the Island Hermitage.

== Lifestyle ==
All the monastics at the Island Hermitage practice walking for alms on a daily basis except for the full moon day when they are fed by acolyte-devotees who come to observe Five Precepts or Eight Precepts.

== Library ==
The library at the Island Hermitage is a large Buddhist library based on a wide variety of Buddhist and non-Buddhist collections, books suitable for study for those living within a forest monastic environment. One of the most notable aspects of the library is that it has amassed a collection of the Pāli Canon in six different scripts i.e. Sinhalese, Thai, Burmese, Devanagari, Roman and German.

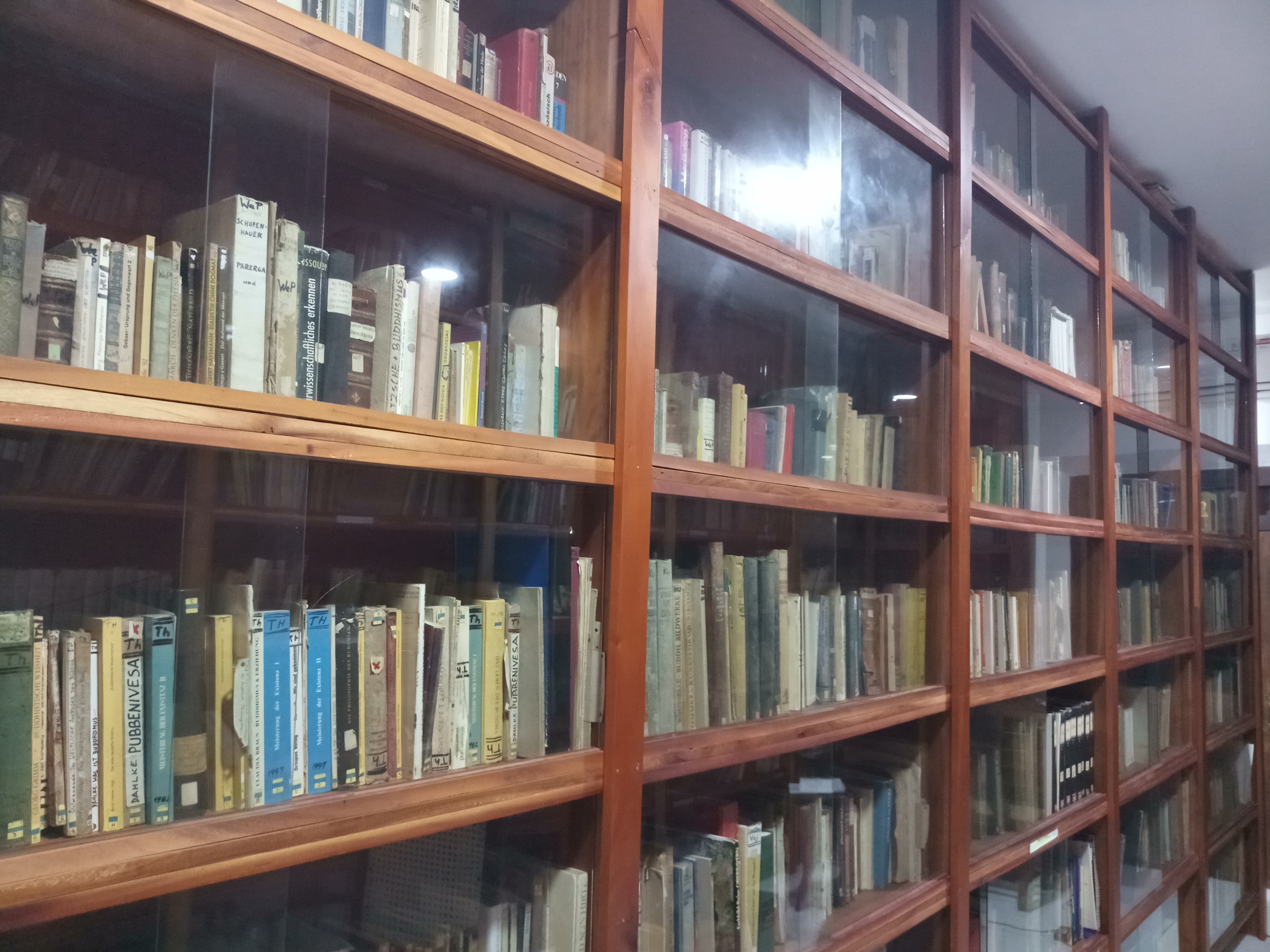
Rehoused library at the Island Hermitage

Its core collection lies in the areas of reference works such as encyclopedias of Buddhism, creative works, manuscripts, periodical publications including magazines, journals and books and other historical reports regarding resident monks etc. Therefore, Island Hermitage library can be seen as a place where a beginner to Buddhism can read about the basics and a scholar can carry out his research. Over the course of its history, the library’s collection has grown to include a proliferation of books on all subjects. There seems to have been an effective record-keeping practice that ensured the growth of the library by late Western monks who lived here. Unfortunately, many collections of records are believed to have been destroyed over the years due to poor maintenance. Almost all the items in the library have not been digitized and are only available in physical form.

The Island Hermitage library was long housed in the main building of the monastery, but in 2016 repairs to the damaged building were successfully carried out in order to protect and unify its vast collection. As of 2018, the library has been rehoused in an air-conditioned room and opened for both local and foreign monks and laity-acolytes to carry out their researches.

== Abbots ==
- Venerable Nyanatiloka: 1911–1957
- Venerable Nyanaloka: 1957–1976
- Venerable Anuragoda Piyaratana Mahathera: 1976–1994 (?)
- Venerable Rakkhita
- Venerable Nyanasanta
- Venerable Gangodawila Muditamano
- Venerable Rajgama Vivekavihārī

== Book scanning project ==
Currently, a group of monks from the Galduwa tradition, under the patronage of the current abbot, are working on a project to non-destructively digitally scan and preserve the antique books in the library. Not being an automated process, it is a somewhat time-consuming and dull technique. Bindings of the books are not removed and the books are scanned non-intrusively two pages at a time for the purpose of converting into digital ebook files later. Moreover, this project aims at developing an electronic catalogue database of the library's contents in order to retrieve the data efficiently for research work and to keep the collection intact.

== Notable monastic residents ==
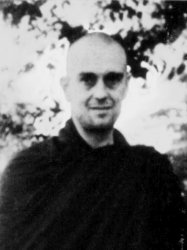
Ñaṇavīra Thera

- Venerable Gnanananda (Sri Lankan) — Founder of the world-renowned Mahamevnawa Buddhist Monastery Network and a well-known translator of the Sutta Pitaka into simple Sinhala Language.
- Venerable Mahinda (Sikkimese) — a famous poet in the Sinhalese language, his poems are still included in Sinhalese school books.
- Venerable Nyanadhara (German).
- Venerable Nyanaponika (German) — closest disciple of Ven. Nyanatiloka, the editor of his works, and his literary heir. He wrote Heart of Buddhist Meditation and established the Buddhist Publication Society in Kandy.
- Venerable Nyanasatta (Czechoslovak) — had several publications in Esperanto as well as English to his credit.
- Venerable Soma (Sri Lankan) — known for his scholarly works, in his later years his thoughts turned more to poetry.
- Venerable Ñāṇamoli (English) — a great scholar and translator of some of the most difficult Pali texts of Theravada Buddhism. His magnum opus was the translation of Buddhaghosa's Visuddhimagga, a famous commentary.
- Venerable Ñāṇavīra (English) — well known as the author of Notes on Dhamma.
- Venerable Ñānasānta (Austrian) — long-time librarian, later abbot.
- Venerable Nyanavimala (German) — especially known for his walking tour (carika) throughout Sri Lanka for 25 years.
- Bhikkhu Ñāṇajīvako (Serbo-Croatian) — writer and philosopher.
- Venerable Bodhesako (American) — writer and editor of Ven. Ñāṇavīra's works. He wrote Change and established the Path Press.
- Venerable Ñāṇananda (Sri Lankan) — known for his books such as Concept and Reality.
- Venerable Ñāṇadīpa Thera (French-born) — known for his three-walled solitary mud huts in the Laggala forests.

== See also ==
- Nyanatiloka Mahathera
- Nyanaponika Thera
- Ñāṇamoli Bhikkhu
- Ñāṇavīra Thera
- Samanera Bodhesako
- Katukurunde Nyanananda Thera
- Sri Kalyani Yogasrama Samstha
- Buddhist Publication Society
- Pariyatti (bookstore)
- Path Press
