= Timeline of Buddhism =

Chronology of the Buddhist religion

The purpose of this timeline is to give a detailed account of Buddhism from the birth of Gautama Buddha to the present.

== Timeline ==
Timeline: Development and propagation of Buddhist traditions (c. 450 BCE – c. 1300 CE)

450 BCE
250 BCE
100 CE
500 CE
700 CE
800 CE
1200 CE

India

Early
Saṅgha

Early Buddhist schools
Mahāyāna
Vajrayāna

Sri Lanka &
Southeast Asia

Theravāda

Tibetan Buddhism

Nyingma

Kadam
Kagyu

Dagpo
Sakya

Jonang

East Asia

Early Buddhist schools
and Mahāyāna
(via the Silk Road
to China, and ocean
contact from India to Vietnam)

Tangmi

Nara (Rokushū)

Shingon

Chan

Thiền, Seon

Zen
Tiantai / Jìngtǔ

Tendai

Nichiren

Jōdo-shū

Central Asia & Tarim Basin

Greco-Buddhism

Silk Road Buddhism

450 BCE
250 BCE
100 CE
500 CE
700 CE
800 CE
1200 CE

Legend:	= Theravāda	= Mahāyāna	= Vajrayāna	= Various / syncretic

== Dates ==
=== 6th–5th century BCE ===
Date	Event
c. 563 BCE or c. 480 BCE	The birth of Siddhartha Gautama. The approximate date of Gautama Buddha's birth and death are uncertain. Most historians in the early 20th century dated his lifetime as circa 563 BCE to 483 BCE. More recently his death is dated later, between 411 and 400 BCE, while at a symposium on this question held in 1988, the majority of those who presented definite opinions gave dates within 20 years either side of 400 BCE for the Buddha's death.
c. 413–345 BCE	Shishunaga, a minister of the ruling Hiranyaka dynasty of Magadha, is placed on the throne and begins the Shishunaga dynasty, after the sitting king is deposed by the people.

=== 4th century BCE ===
Date	Event
383 BCE or c. 330 BCE	The Second Buddhist council is convened by Kalasoka of the Shishunaga dynasty and held in Vaishali. The Sangha divides into the Sthaviravadins and the Mahasanghikas led by the monk Mahādeva, primarily over the question of addition or subtraction of rules from the Vinaya.
345–321 BCE	The Nanda Empire briefly predominates in Magadha over the Shishunagas.
326 BCE	Alexander the Great reaches Northwestern India. The Indo-Greek Kingdom that arise in the aftermath has a large influence upon the development of Buddhism.
c. 324 BCE	Pyrrho, a philosopher in Alexander the Great's court, may have learnt elements of Buddhist philosophy in India from the gymnosophists. Parts of Buddhism, most notably the three marks of existence, may have influenced his new philosophy of Pyrrhonism which he introduces into Hellenistic philosophy.
c. 321 – c. 297 BCE	The reign of Chandragupta Maurya, grandfather of Ashoka, who subdues the Nanda Empire by c. 320 BCE, and gradually conquers much of northern India.

=== 3rd century BCE ===
Date	Event
c. 250 BCE	Third Buddhist council, convened by Ashoka and chaired by Moggaliputta-Tissa, compiles the Kathāvatthu to refute the heretical views and theories held by some Buddhist sects. Edicts of Ashoka in the Maurya Empire in support of Buddhism.
c. 250 BCE	Ashoka sends various Buddhist missionaries to faraway countries, as far as China, mainland Southeast Asia and the Malay kingdoms in the east and the Hellenistic kingdoms in the west, in order to make Buddhism known to them.
c. 250 BCE	First-fully developed examples of Kharosthi script in the inscriptions at Shahbaz Garhi and Mānsehrā in Gandhara.
c. 250 BCE	Indian traders regularly visit ports in the Arabian Peninsula, explaining the prevalence of place names in the region with Indian or Buddhist origin; e.g., bahar (from Sanskrit vihara (a Buddhist monastery). Ashokan emissary monks bring Buddhism to Suvarnabhumi, the location of which is disputed. The Dīpavaṃsa says it was a Mon seafaring settlement in present-day Myanmar.
c. 220 BCE	Theravada is officially introduced to Sri Lanka by the Mahinda, son of Ashoka, during the reign of Devanampiya Tissa of Anuradhapura.

=== 2nd century BCE ===
Date	Event
185 BCE	General Pushyamitra Shunga overthrows the Maurya Empire and establishes the Shunga Empire, apparently starting a wave of persecution against Buddhism.
180 BCE	Demetrius I of Bactria invades India as far as Pataliputra and establishes the Indo-Greek Kingdom (180–10 BCE), under which Buddhism flourishes.
165–130 BCE	Reign of the Indo-Greek king Menander I, who converts to Buddhism under the sage Nagasena according to the account of the Milinda Panha.
121 BCE	The Chinese Emperor Han Wudi (156–87 BCE) receives two golden statues of the Buddha, according to inscriptions in the Mogao Caves, Dunhuang.

=== 1st century BCE ===
Date	Event
c. 55 BCE	The Indo-Greek governor Theodorus enshrines relics of the Buddha, dedicating them to the deified "Lord Shakyamuni."
29 BCE	According to the Sinhalese chronicles, the content of the Pali Canon is written down in the reign of King Vaṭṭagamiṇi (29–17 BCE)
2 BCE	The Hou Hanshu records the visit in 2 BCE of Yuezhi envoys to the Chinese capital, who give oral teachings on Buddhist sutras.

=== 1st century ===
Date	Event
67	Liu Ying's sponsorship of Buddhism is the first documented case of Buddhist practices in China.
67	Buddhism comes to China with the two monks Kasyapa and Dharmaraksha.
68	Buddhism is officially established in China with the founding of the White Horse Temple.
78	Ban Chao, a Chinese General, subdues the Buddhist Kingdom of Khotan.
c. 78–101	According to Mahayana tradition, the Fourth Buddhist council takes place under Kushana king Kanishka's reign, near Jalandar, India.

=== 2nd century ===
Date	Event
116	The Kushans, under Kanishka, establish a kingdom centered on Kashgar, also taking control of Khotan and Yarkand in the Tarim Basin.
148	An Shigao, a Parthian prince and Buddhist monk, arrives in China and proceeds to make the first translations of Theravada texts into Chinese.
c. 150–250	Indian and Central Asian Buddhists travel to Vietnam.
178	The Kushan monk Lokaksema travels to the Chinese capital of Loyang and becomes the first known translator of Mahayana texts into Chinese.

=== 3rd century ===
Date	Event
c. 250	Use of Kharoṣṭhī script in Gandhara stops.
c. 250–350	Kharoṣṭhī script is used in the southern Silk Road cities of Khotan and Niya.
296	The earliest surviving Chinese Buddhist manuscript dates from this year (Zhu Fo Yao Ji Jing, discovered in Dalian, late 2005).

=== 4th century ===
Date	Event
320–467	The university at Nalanda grows to support 3,000–10,000 monks.
372	The monk Sundo (順道, or Shundao in Chinese) was sent by Fu Jian (337–385) (苻堅) of Former Qin to the court of the King Sosurim of Goguryeo, in modern-day Korea. Subsequently, paper making was established in Korea.
384	The Gandharan monk Marananta arrived in Baekje, in modern-day Korea, and the royal family received the strain of Buddhism he brought. King Asin of Baekje proclaimed, "people should believe in Buddhism and seek happiness."
399–414	Faxian travels from China to India, then returns to translate Buddhist works into Chinese.

=== 5th century ===
Date	Event
c. 5th century	The kingdom of Funan (centered in modern Cambodia) begins to advocate Buddhism in a departure from Hinduism. Earliest evidence of Buddhism in Myanmar (Pali inscriptions). Earliest evidence of Buddhism in Indonesian (statues). Earliest reinterpretations of Pali texts. The stupa at Dambulla (Sri Lanka) is constructed.
402	At the request of Yao Xing, Kumārajīva travels to Chang'an and translates many Buddhist texts into Chinese.
403	In China, Lushan Huiyuan argues that Buddhist monks should be exempt from bowing to the emperor.
405	Yao Xing honours Kumārajīva.
425	Buddhism reaches Sumatra.
464	Buddhabhadra reaches China to preach Buddhism.
485	Five monks from Gandhara travel to the country of Fusang (Japan, or possibly the Americas), where they introduce Buddhism.
495	The Shaolin Monastery is built in the name of Buddhabhadra, by edict of emperor Wei Xiao Wen.

=== 6th century ===
Date	Event
527	Bodhidharma settles into the Shaolin Monastery in Henan province of China.
531–579	Reign of the Zoroastrian king, Khosrow I, who orders the translation of Jataka tales into Persian.
538 or 552	Buddhism is introduced to Japan via Baekje (Korea), according to Nihonshoki; some scholars place this event in 538.
c. 575	Zen adherents enter Vietnam from China.

=== 7th century ===
Date	Event
607	A Japanese imperial envoy is dispatched to Sui, China to obtain copies of sutras.
616–634	Jingwan begins carving sutras onto stone at Fangshan, Yuzhou, 75km southwest of modern-day Beijing.
617–649	Reign of Songtsen Gampo of Tibet, who is traditionally held to be the first Tibetan King to promote the bringing of Buddhism to Tibet.
627–645	Xuanzang travels to India, noting the persecution of Buddhists by Sasanka (king of Gauda, a state in northwest Bengal) before returning to Chang'an in China to translate Buddhist scriptures.
c. 650	End of sporadic Buddhist rule in the Sindh.
671	Chinese Buddhist pilgrim Yijing visits Palembang, capital of the partly Buddhist kingdom of Srivijaya on the island of Sumatra, Indonesia, and reports over 1000 Buddhist monks in residence.
671	Uisang returns to Korea after studying Chinese Huayan Buddhism and founds the Hwaeom school.

=== 8th century ===
Date	Event
c. 8th century	Buddhist Jataka tales are translated into Syriac and Arabic as Kalilag and Damnag. An account of Buddha's life is translated into Greek by John of Damascus and widely circulated among Christians as the story of Barlaam and Josaphat. By the 14th century, this story of Josaphat becomes so popular that he is made a Catholic Saint.
736	Huayan is transmitted to Japan via Korea, when Rōben invites the Korean Hwaeom monk Simsang to lecture, and formally founds Japan's Kegon tradition in the Tōdai-ji temple.
743–754	The Chinese monk Jianzhen attempts to reach Japan eleven times, succeeding in 754 to establish the Japanese Ritsu school, which specialises in the vinaya (monastic rules).
760–830	Construction is begun on Borobudur, the famous Indonesian Buddhist structure. It is completed as a Buddhist monument in 830, after about 50 years of work.

=== 9th century ===
Date	Event
804	Under the reign of Emperor Kanmu of Japan, a fleet of four ships sets sail for mainland China. Of the two ships that arrive, one carries the monk Kūkai—recently ordained by the Japanese government as a Bhikkhu—who absorbs Vajrayana teachings in Chang'an and returns to Japan to found the Japanese Shingon school. The other ship carries the monk Saichō, who returns to Japan to found the Japanese Tendai school, partly based upon the Chinese Tiantai tradition.
838 to 841	Langdarma rules in Tibet, and persecutes Buddhism
838–847	Ennin, a priest of the Tendai school, travels in China for nine years. He reaches both the famous Buddhist mountain of Wutaishan and the Chinese capital, Chang'an, keeping a detailed diary that is a primary source for this period of Chinese history, including the Buddhist persecution.
841–846	Emperor Wuzong of the Tang dynasty (given name: Li Yan) reigns in China; he is one of three Chinese emperors to prohibit Buddhism. From 843 to 845, Wuzong carries out the Great Anti-Buddhist Persecution, permanently weakening the institutional structure of Buddhism in China.
859	The Caodong school of Zen is founded by Dongshan Liangjie and his disciples in southern China.

=== 10th century ===
Date	Event
c. 10th century	Buddhist temple construction commences at Bagan, Myanmar.
c. 10th century	In Tibet, a strong Buddhist revival is begun.
971	Chinese Song dynasty commissions Chengdu woodcarvers to carve the entire Buddhist canon for printing. Work is completed in 983; 130,000 blocks are produced, in total.
911	A printed copy of the Song dynasty Buddhist canon arrives in Korea, impressing the government.

=== 11th century ===
Date	Event
c. 11th century	Marpa, Konchog Gyalpo, Atisha, and others introduce the Sarma lineages into Tibet.
1009	Vietnam's Lý dynasty begins, which is partly brought about by an alliance with the Buddhist monkhood. Ly emperors patronize Mahayana Buddhism, in addition to traditional spirits.
1010	Korea begins carving its own woodblock print edition of the Buddhist canon. No completion date is known; the canon is continuously expanded, with the arrival of new texts from China.
1017	In Southeast Asia, and especially in Sri Lanka, the Bhikkhuni (Buddhist nuns) Order dies out due to invasions. The bhikkhu line in Sri Lanka is later revived with bhikkhus from Burma.
1025	Srivijaya, a Buddhist kingdom based in Sumatra, is raided by the Chola empire of southern India; it survives, but declines in importance. Shortly after the raid, the centre of the kingdom moves northward from Palembang to Jambi-Melayu.
1056	King Anawrahta of Pagan Kingdom converts to Theravada Buddhism.
1057	Anawrahta captures Thaton Lower Burma, strengthening Theravada Buddhism in the country.
1063	A copy of the Khitans' printed canon arrives in Korea from mainland China.
1070	Bhikkhus from Pagan arrive in Polonnaruwa, Sri Lanka to reinstate the Theravada ordination line.
1084–1112	In Myanmar, King Kyansittha reigns. He completes the building of the Shwezigon Pagoda, a shrine for relics of the Buddha, including a tooth brought from Sri Lanka. Various inscriptions refer to him as an incarnation of Vishnu, a chakravartin, a bodhisattva, and dharmaraja.

=== 12th century ===
Date	Event
1100–1125	Huizong reigns during the Chinese Song dynasty and outlaws Buddhism to promote the Dao. He is one of three Chinese emperors to have prohibited Buddhism.
1133–1212	Hōnen establishes Pure Land Buddhism as an independent sect in Japan.
1164	Polonnaruwa, Sri Lanka destroyed by foreign invasion. With the guidance of two forest monks – Ven. Mahākassapa Thera and Ven. Sāriputta Thera, Parakramabahu I reunites all bhikkhus in Sri Lanka into the Mahavihara sect.
1171	Anawrahta of Pagan upon request of King Vijayabahu I of Ceylon sends monks and scriptures to restart Buddhism in the island kingdom.
1181	The self-styled bodhisattva Jayavarman VII, a devout follower of Mahayana Buddhism (though he also patronised Hinduism), assumes control of the Khmer kingdom. He constructs the Bayon, the most prominent Buddhist structure in the Angkor temple complex. This sets the stage for the later conversion of the Khmer people to Theravada Buddhism.
1190	King Sithu II of Pagan realigns Burmese Buddhism with the Mahavihara school of Ceylon.

=== 13th century ===
Date	Event
c. 1200	The great Buddhist educational centre at Nalanda, India, (the origin of Buddhism) where various subjects were taught subjects such as Buddhism, Logic, Philosophy, Law, Medicine, Grammar, Yoga, Mathematics, Alchemy, and Astrology, is sacked, looted and burnt by Muhammad bin Bakhtiyar Khilji.
1222	Birth of Nichiren Daishonin (1222–1282), the Japanese founder of Nichiren Buddhism.
1227	Dogen Zenji takes the Caodong school of Zen from China to Japan as the Sōtō sect.
1236	Bhikkhus from Kañcipuram, India, arrive in Sri Lanka to revive the Theravada ordination line.
1238	The Thai Kingdom of Sukhothai is established, with Theravada Buddhism as the state religion.
1244	Eiheiji Soto Zen Temple and Monastery are established by Dogen Zenji.
c. 1250	Theravada overtakes Mahayana—previously practised alongside Hinduism—as the dominant form of Buddhism in Cambodia; Sri Lanka is an influence in this change.
1260–1270	Kublai Khan makes the Buddhism (especially the Tibetan Buddhism) the de facto state religion of the Yuan dynasty, establishing the Bureau of Buddhist and Tibetan Affairs and appointing Sakya Imperial Preceptors.
1279–1298	Sukhothai's third and most famous ruler, Ram Khamhaeng (Rama the Bold), reigns and makes vassals of Laos, much of modern Thailand, Pegu (Burma), and parts of the Malay Peninsula, thus giving rise to Sukhothai artistic tradition. After Ram Khamhaeng's death, Sukhothai loses control of its territories as its vassals become independent.
1285	Arghun makes the Ilkhanate a Buddhist state.
1287	The Pagan Empire, the largest Theravada kingdom of Southeast Asia, falls due to Mongol invasions.
1295	Mongol leader Ghazan Khan is converted to Islam, ending a line of Tantric Buddhist leaders.

=== 14th century ===
Date	Event
c. 1300	In Persia, the historian Rashid-al-Din Hamadani records some eleven Buddhist texts circulating in Arabic translation, amongst which the Sukhavati-vyuha and Karanda-vyuha Sutras are recognizable. Portions of the Samyutta and Anguttara-Nikayas, along with parts of the Maitreya-vyakarana, are identified in this collection.
1305–1316	Buddhists in Persia attempt to convert Uldjaitu Khan.
1312	In the Mahayana tradition during the 13th century, the Japanese Mugai Nyodai became the first female abbess and thus the first ordained female Zen master.
1321	Sojiji Soto Zen Temple and Monastery established by Keizan Zenji.
1351	In Thailand, U Thong, possibly the son of a Chinese merchant family, establishes Ayutthaya as his capital and takes the name of Ramathibodi.
1391–1474	Gyalwa Gendun Drubpa, first Dalai Lama of Tibet.

=== 15th century ===
Date	Event
1405–1431	The Chinese eunuch admiral Zheng He makes seven voyages in this period, through Southeast Asia, India, the Persian Gulf, East Africa, and Egypt. At the time, Buddhism is well-established in China, so visited peoples may have had exposure to Chinese Buddhism.

=== 16th century ===
Date	Event
1578	Altan Khan of the Tümed gives the title of Dalai Lama to Sonam Gyatso (later known as the third Dalai Lama).

=== 17th century ===
Date	Event
c. 1600-1700s	When Vietnam divides during this period, the Nguyễn rulers of the south choose to support Mahayana Buddhism as an integrative ideology for the ethnically plural society of their kingdom, which is also populated by Chams and other minorities.
1614	The Toyotomi family rebuilds a great image of Buddha at the Temple of Hōkōji in Kyōtō.
1615	The Oirat Mongols convert to the Geluk school of Tibetan Buddhism.
1635	In Zanabazar, the first Jebtsundamba Khutughtu is born as a great-grandson of Abadai Khan of the Khalkha.
1642	Güüshi Khan of the Khoshuud donates the sovereignty of Tibet to the fifth Dalai Lama.

=== 18th century ===
Date	Event
1753	Sri Lanka reinstatement of monks ordination from Thailand – the Siam Nikaya lineage.

=== 19th century ===
Date	Event
1802–1820	Nguyễn Ánh comes to the throne of the first united Vietnam; he succeeds by quelling the Tayson rebellion in south Vietnam with help from Rama I in Bangkok, then takes over the north from the remaining Trinh. After coming to power, he creates a Confucianist orthodox state and is eager to limit the competing influence of Buddhism. He forbids adult men to attend Buddhist ceremonies.
1820–1841	Minh Mạng reigns in Vietnam, further restricting Buddhism. He insists that all monks be assigned to cloisters and carry identification documents. He also places new restrictions on printed material and begins the persecution of Catholic missionaries and converts that his successors (not without provocation) continue.
1844	Elizabeth Peabody became the first person to translate any Buddhist scripture into English, translating a chapter of the Lotus Sutra from its French translation.
1851–1868	In Thailand, King Mongkut—himself a former monk—conducts a campaign to reform and modernise the monkhood, a movement that has continued in the present century under the inspiration of several great ascetic monks from the northeast part of the country.
1860	In Sri Lanka, against all expectations, the monastic and lay communities bring about a major revival in Buddhism, a movement that goes hand in hand with growing nationalism; the revival follows a period of persecution by foreign powers. Since then, Buddhism has flourished, and Sri Lankan monks and expatriate lay people have been prominent in spreading Theravada Buddhism in Asia, the West, and even in Africa.
1879	A council is convened under the patronage of King Mindon of Burma to re-edit the Pali canon. The king has the texts engraved on 729 stones, which are then set upright on the grounds of a monastery near Mandalay.
1880	Madame Blavatsky and Colonel Olcott became the first Westerners to receive the refuges and precepts, the ceremony by which one traditionally becomes a Buddhist; thus Blavatsky was the first Western woman to do so.
1882	Jade Buddha Temple is founded in Shanghai, China, with two Jade Buddha statues imported from Burma.
1884	Irish-born U Dhammaloka ordained in Burma; first named but not first known western bhikkhu.
1893	The World Parliament of Religions meets in Chicago, Illinois; Anagarika Dharmapala and Soyen Shaku attend.
1896	Using Fa Xian's records, Nepalese archaeologists rediscover the great stone pillar of Ashoka at Lumbini.
1899	Gordon Douglas is ordained in Myanmar; until recently thought to be the first Westerner to be ordained in the Theravada tradition.

=== 20th century ===
Date	Event
1902	Charles Henry Allan Bennett, a British national, ordains as a Theravada monk in Ceylon as Bhikkhu Ananda Metteyya.
1903	Formation of the International Buddhist Society known as Buddhasāsana Samāgama which went on to gain official representatives in Austria, Burma, Ceylon, China, Germany, Italy, America, and England.
1903	First publication of periodical Buddhism: An Illustrated Review, goes on to appear on 500 to 600 reading tables of libraries across Europe.
1904	First continental European, Anton Walther Florus Gueth, was accepted into the Sangha as Ñāṇatiloka Bhikkhu. Ñāṇatiloka went on to become the father of western monks in Ceylon.
1907	The Buddhist Society of Great Britain and Ireland forms.
1908	Charles Henry Allan Bennett a British national previously ordained as a Theravada monk as Bhikkhu Ananda Metteyya in Burma leads the First Buddhist Mission to the West.
1909	Release of the periodical The Buddhist Review (1909 to 1922) by The Buddhist Society of Great Britain and Ireland.
1911	U Dhammaloka tried for sedition for opposition to Christian missionaries in Burma.
1912	The German monk Nyanatiloka founded the first monastery for Western Theravada monks, the Island Hermitage, in Sri Lanka.
1922	Zenshuji Soto Mission is founded as the first Soto Zen temple in North America.
1926	Officially The Buddhist Society of Great Britain and Ireland dissolved in 1925 and superseded by the Buddhist Lodge in London, in 1926.
1930	Soka Gakkai is founded in Japan.
1949	Mahabodhi Temple in Bodh Gaya is returned to partial Buddhist control.
1950	World Fellowship of Buddhists is founded in Colombo, Sri Lanka.
1952	German Dharmaduta Society founded by Asoka Weeraratna in Colombo, Sri Lanka on September 21, 1952, to spread Buddhism in Germany and other western countries.It was originally known as Lanka Dhammaduta Society.
1953	The Buddhist Lodge had changed its name and was known as the Buddhist Society. It had relocated to its current address in Eccleston Square. Notably its journals have been Buddhism and The Middle Way and Christmas Humphreys was its president from 1926 until his death 1983.
1954	The Sixth Buddhist Council is held in Rangoon, Burma, organized by U Nu. It ends in time for the 2500th anniversary of the passing of the Buddha according to the Burmese reckoning.
1955	The Buddhist Society of India is founded in Mumbai, Maharashtra, India.
1956	the father of the Indian Constitution and untouchable leader B. R. Ambedkar converts to Navayana Buddhism, with more than 650,000 followers—beginning the modern Neo-Buddhist movement.
1956	The Zen Studies Society is founded in New York City to support the work of D.T. Suzuki.
1957	First Theravada Buddhist Mission to Germany from Sri Lanka sponsored by the German Dharmaduta Society founded by Asoka Weeraratna. The Mission comprised Ven. Soma, Ven. Kheminde and Ven. Vinitha of the Vajiraramaya Temple in Colombo, and was accompanied by Asoka Weeraratna.
1957	Establishment of the Berlin Buddhist Vihara in Berlin – Frohnau, Germany with residential monks from Sri Lanka, by the German Dharmaduta Society upon purchase of Das Buddhistische Haus founded by Dr. Paul Dahlke in 1924. This is the first Theravada Buddhist Vihara in continental Europe.
1957	Caves near the summit of Pai-tai mountain, Fangshan district, 75 km southwest of Beijing, are reopened, revealing thousands of Buddhist sutras that had been carved onto stone since the 7th century. Seven sets of rubbings are made, and the stones are numbered, in work that continues until 1959.
1959	The 14th Dalai Lama flees Tibet amidst unrest and establishes an exile community in India. Monasteries that participated in or sheltered agents of partisan violence were damaged, burned, or destroyed in the fighting.
1962	The Dharma Realm Buddhist Association is founded by Tripitaka Master Shramana Hsuan Hua, who later founds the City of Ten Thousand Buddhas and ordains the first five fully ordained American Buddhist monks and nuns.
1962	The San Francisco Zen Center is founded by Shunryu Suzuki.
1963	Thích Quảng Đức immolates himself to protest the oppression of the Buddhist religion by Ngo Dinh Diem.
1965	The Burmese government arrests over 700 monks in Hmawbi, near Rangoon, for refusing to accept government rule.
1965	The Johnstone House Trust was formed with the objectives "to make available to the public facilities for study and meditation based on Buddhist and other religious teaching leading to mental and spiritual well-being, and to provide guidance for those in need of such help and in particular the utilisation of the property known as Johnstone House, Eskdalemuir, for such purposes." In 1967, the Johnstone House facilities were offered to Tibetan Buddhist lamas led by Akong Rinpoché, under whose guidance and direction the Kagyu Samyé Ling Tibetan Buddhist monastery became the first, and swiftly grew to become the largest, Tibetan Buddhist centre in Europe.
1966	The World Buddhist Sangha Council is convened by Theravadins in Sri Lanka with the hope of bridging differences and working together. The first convention is attended by leading monks from many countries and sects, Mahayana as well as Theravada. Nine Basic Points Unifying the Theravada and Mahayana are written by Ven. Walpola Rahula are approved unanimously.
1966	Freda Bedi, a British woman, becomes the first Western woman to take ordination in Tibetan Buddhism.
1967	Friends of the Western Sangha (later Friends of the Western Buddhist Order) founded by Urgyen Sangharakshita
1968	August. First ordinations into the Western Buddhist Order (Founder: Urgyen Sangharakshita)
1968	The Shurangama Sutra and Shurangama Mantra are lectured for the first time in the West (San Francisco) by Tripitaka Master Shramana Hsuan Hua during a 90-day retreat. The first five American Bhikshus and Bhikshunis are ordained in the Chinese tradition including the oldest still-in-robes American Bhikshuni nun Heng Chr.
1970s	Indonesian Archaeological Service and UNESCO restore Borobodur.
1974	Wat Pah Nanachat, the first monastery dedicated to providing training and support for western Buddhist monks in the Thai Forest Tradition is founded by Venerable Ajahn Chah in Thailand. The monks trained here would later establish branch monasteries throughout the world.
1974	The Naropa Institute (now Naropa University) is founded in Boulder, Colorado.
1974	In Burma, during demonstrations at U Thant's funeral, 600 monks are arrested and several are bayoneted by government forces.
1975	Lao Communist rulers attempt to change attitudes to religion—in particular, calling on monks to work, not beg. This causes many to return to lay life, but Buddhism remains popular.
1975	The Insight Meditation Society is established in Barre, Massachusetts.
1975–1979	Cambodian Communists under Pol Pot try to completely destroy Buddhism, and very nearly succeed. By the time of the Vietnamese invasion of Cambodia in 1978, nearly every monk and religious intellectual has been either murdered or driven into exile, and nearly every temple and Buddhist library has been destroyed.
1976	Bhikshus Rev. Heng Sure and Rev. Heng Chau, the American Buddhist Monk disciples of Ven. Tripitaka Master Hsuan Hua, for the sake of world peace, undertook an over six hundred mile three steps one bow pilgrimage from Los Angeles area to City of Ten Thousand Buddhas in Mendocino area, repeatedly taking three steps and one bow to cover the entire journey. In the entire 2.5 years taken to make the pilgrimage, Shramana Heng Sure observed a practice of total silence.
1976	Following a demonstration in Burma, the government seeks to discredit the critical monk La Ba by claiming that he is a cannibal and a murderer.
1978	In Burma, more monks and novices are arrested, disrobed, and imprisoned by the government. Monasteries are closed and property seized. The critical monk U Nayaka is arrested and dies, the government claiming it is suicide.
1980	The Burmese military government asserts authority over the sangha, and violence against monks continues through the decade.
1982	The Plum Village Monastery was founded by Thich Nhat Hanh and Chan Khong, two Vietnamese monastics, under the Plum Village Tradition.
1983	The Shanghai Institute of Buddhism is established at Jade Buddha Temple, under the Shanghai Buddhist Association.
1988	During the 1988 uprising, SPDC troops gun down monks. After the uprising, U Nyanissara, a senior monk, records a tape that discusses democracy in Buddhist precepts; the tape is banned. In Estonia, the first political opposition party, Estonian National Independence Party was founded by the head of Estonian Buddhist Brotherhood, Vello Vaartnou.
1990	August 27 – Over 7000 monks meet in Mandalay, in Burma, to call for a boycott of the military. They refuse to accept alms from military families or perform services for them. The military government seizes monasteries and arrests hundreds of monks, including senior monks U Sumangala and U Yewata. The monks face long-term imprisonment, and all boycotting monks are disrobed; some monks are tortured during interrogation.
1992	The Buddha Statue of Hyderabad, India is installed, a work of former Chief Minister of Andhra Pradesh, Late Sri N.T. Rama Rao. The 16-meter tall, 350-ton monolithic colossus rises high from the placid waters of picturesque Husain Sagar Lake. It is made of white granite, finely sculptured and stands majestically amidst the shimmering waters of the lake. It is later consecrated by Dalai Lama.
1996	Subhana Barzagi Roshi became the Diamond Sangha's first female roshi (Zen teacher) when she received transmission on March 9, 1996, in Australia. In the ceremony Subhanna also became the first female roshi in the lineage of Robert Aitken Roshi.
1996	A Bhikkhuni (Buddhist nuns) Order and lineage is revived in Sarnath, India through the efforts of Sakyadhita, an International Buddhist Women Association. The revival is done with some resistance from some of the more literal interpreters of the Buddhist Vinaya (monastic code) and lauded by others in the community.
1998	January 25 – Liberation Tigers of Tamil Eelam (LTTE) militants commit a deadly suicide attack on Sri Lanka's most sacred Buddhist site and a UNESCO World Heritage centre: the Temple of the Tooth, where Buddha's tooth relic is enshrined. Eight civilians are killed and 25 others are injured and significant damage is done to the temple structure, which was first constructed in 1592.
1998	Sherry Chayat, born in Brooklyn, became the first American woman to receive transmission in the Rinzai school of Buddhism.

=== 21st century ===
Date	Event
2001	May – Two of the world's tallest ancient Buddha statues, the Buddhas of Bamiyan, are completely destroyed by the Taliban in Bamyan, Afghanistan.
2002	Khenmo Drolma, an American woman, became the first bhikkhuni in the Drikung Kagyu lineage of Buddhism, getting ordained in Taiwan in 2002.
2003	Ayya Sudhamma Bhikkhuni became the first American-born woman to gain bhikkhuni ordination in the Theravada school in Sri Lanka.
2004	Khenmo Drolma became the first westerner, male or female, to be installed as an abbot in the Drikung Kagyu lineage of Buddhism. She was installed as the abbot of the Vajra Dakini Nunnery in 2004. The Vajra Dakini Nunnery does not follow the Eight Garudhammas.
2004	April – In Sri Lanka, Buddhist monks acting as candidates for the Jathika Hela Urumaya party win nine seats in elections.
2006	March – Merle Kodo Boyd, born in Texas, became the first African–American woman ever to receive Dharma transmission in Zen Buddhism.
2006	April – The Government of the People's Republic of China sponsors the First World Buddhist Forum in Mount Putuo, Zhejiang Province. Notably absent was the Dalai Lama.
2007	Myokei Caine-Barrett, born and ordained in Japan, became the first female Nichiren priest in her affiliated Nichiren Order of North America.
2008	After a 10-year process of advanced training culminating in a ceremony called shitsugo (literally "room-name"), Sherry Chayat received the title of roshi and the name Shinge ("Heart/Mind Flowering") from Eido Roshi, which was the first time that this ceremony was held in the United States.
2010	Western Buddhist Order (Founder: Urgyen Sangharakshita) changes name to Triratna Buddhist Order and Friends of the Western Buddhist Order to Triratna Buddhist Community.
2010	The first Tibetan Buddhist nunnery in America (Vajra Dakini Nunnery in Vermont) was officially consecrated. It offers novice ordination and follows the Drikung Kagyu lineage of Buddhism. The abbot of the Vajra Dakini nunnery is Khenmo Drolma, an American woman, who is the first bhikkhuni in the Drikung Kagyu lineage of Buddhism, having been ordained in Taiwan in 2002. She is also the first westerner, male or female, to be installed as an abbot in the Drikung Kagyu lineage of Buddhism, having been installed as the abbot of the Vajra Dakini Nunnery in 2004. The Vajra Dakini Nunnery does not follow The Eight Garudhammas.
2010	In Northern California, 4 novice nuns were given the full bhikkhuni ordination in the Thai Theravada tradition, which included the double ordination ceremony. Bhante Gunaratana and other monks and nuns were in attendance. It was the first such ordination ever in the Western hemisphere. The following month, more bhikkhuni ordinations were completed in Southern California, led by Walpola Piyananda and other monks and nuns. The bhikkhunis ordained in Southern California were Lakshapathiye Samadhi (born in Sri Lanka), Cariyapanna, Susila, Sammasati (all three born in Vietnam), and Uttamanyana (born in Myanmar).
2010	The Soto Zen Buddhist Association (SZBA) approves a document honoring the women ancestors in the Zen tradition at its biannual meeting on October 8, 2010. Female ancestors, dating back 2,500 years from India, China, and Japan, may now be included in the curriculum, ritual, and training offered to Western Zen students.
2011	The Institute for Buddhist Dialectical Studies (IBD) in Dharamsala, India, conferred the degree of geshe on Venerable Kelsang Wangmo, a German nun, thus making her the world's first female geshe.
2013	Tibetan women were able to take the geshe exams for the first time.
2014	Nalanda University (also known as Nalanda International University) is a newly established university located in Rajgir, near Nalanda, Bihar, India. It has been established in a bid to revive the ancient seat of learning. The university has acquired 455 acres of land for its campus and has been allotted ₹2727 crores (around $454M) by the Indian government. It is also being funded by the governments of China, Singapore, Australia, Thailand, and others.
2016	Twenty Tibetan Buddhist nuns became the first Tibetan women to earn geshe degrees.
2018	Sumedhārāma Buddhist Monastery is established in Portugal, a branch monastery of the Thai Forest Tradition in the lineage of Venerable Ajahn Chah, being the first Theravāda monastery on the Iberian Peninsula.

== See also ==
- History of Buddhism
- Buddhism by country
- Ordination of women in Buddhism
- Silk Road transmission of Buddhism
- List of American Buddhists
- List of Buddhists
- Timeline of Zen Buddhism in the United States

== Sources ==
=== Printed sources ===
- Cousins, L. S. (1996), "The dating of the historical Buddha: a review article", Journal of the Royal Asiatic Society, Third Series, 6 (1): 57–63, doi:10.1017/S1356186300014760, S2CID 162929573
- Geiger, Wilhelm (1912), The Mahawamsa or Great Chronicle of Ceylon, Oxford University Press (for the Pali Text Society)
- Prebish, Charles S. (2008), "Cooking the Buddhist Books: The Implications of the New Dating of the Buddha for the History of Early Indian Buddhism" (PDF), Journal of Buddhist Ethics, 15: 1–21, archived from the original on January 28, 2012
- Samuel, Geoffrey (2010), The Origins of Yoga and Tantra. Indic Religions to the Thirteenth Century, Cambridge University Press
- Schumann, Hans Wolfgang (2003), The Historical Buddha: The Times, Life, and Teachings of the Founder of Buddhism, Motilal Banarsidass Press, ISBN 8120818172
- Wayman, Alex (1997), Untying the Knots in Buddhism: Selected Essays, Motilal Banarsidass Publ., ISBN 8120813219
