= Buddhism in Germany =

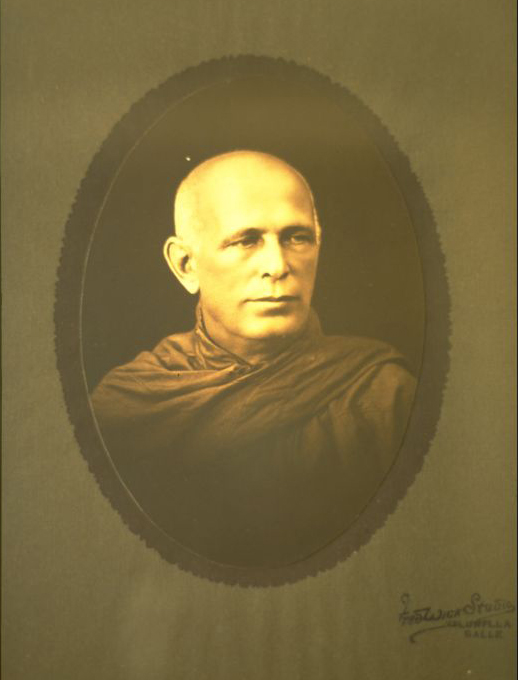
First born German monk Nyanatiloka Maha Thera.

Buddhism in Germany looks back to a history of over 150 years. Arthur Schopenhauer was one of the earliest Germans who were influenced by Buddhism. Schopenhauer got his knowledge of Buddhism from authors like Isaac Jacob Schmidt (1779–1847). German Buddhists or Orientalists like Karl Eugen Neumann, Paul Dahlke, Georg Grimm, Friedrich Zimmermann (Subhadra Bhikschu) and the first German Buddhist monk Nyanatiloka Mahathera were also influenced by Schopenhauer and his understanding of Buddhism. But also German Indologists like Hermann Oldenberg and his work "Buddha, sein Leben, seine Lehre, seine Gemeinde" had an important influence on German Buddhism.

== History ==
In 1888 Subhadra Bickshu (Friedrich Zimmermann) published the first edition of the "Buddhistischer Katechismus", a work based on the "Buddhist Catechism" of Henry Steel Olcott.

In 1903 the first German Buddhist organisation was founded by the Indologist Karl Seidenstücker in Leipzig. In 1904 Florus Anton Gueth became the Theravada monk Nyanatiloka Mahathera. Some important Pali texts were translated into German in the early part of the 20th century by scholars like Karl Eugen Neumann (1865–1915), Nyantiloka and others.

In 1922 Hermann Hesse published his famous work "Siddhartha", which has been translated into many languages.

In 1924 Dr. Paul Dahlke established the first German Buddhist monastery, the "Das Buddhistische Haus" in Berlin.

The German Dharmaduta Society, initially known as the Lanka Dhammaduta Society and dedicated to spreading the message of the Buddha in Germany and other Western countries, was founded by Asoka Weeraratna in Colombo, Sri Lanka in 1952.

In 1952 a German Branch of the Buddhist Order Arya Maitreya Mandala was founded by Lama Anagarika Govinda.

The "Buddhist Seminar" in Hamburg was founded in 1949. As part of the seminar, Paul Debes (1906–2004) gave lectures in Hamburg and northern Germany to audiences of up to 700 people. In October 1954, the Buddhist Society of Hamburg (BGH) was founded, with Paul Debes serving as its chairman and co-founder. The founding of the BGH followed a suggestion by the Buddhist monk Maha Thera Narada from Ceylon.

The German Dharmaduta Society sponsored the first Buddhist Mission from Sri Lanka to Germany, which left the Colombo Harbour by ship 'SS Orantes' on 16 June 1957. The three monks in this historic mission comprised Ven. Soma, Ven. Kheminda and Ven. Vinîta. They were all recruited from the Vajiraramaya Temple, Bambalapitiya in Colombo. Asoka Weeraratna who conceived and initiated this landmark event joined the Mission in Berlin in July 1957 having flown in from Colombo. The mission was accommodated at "Das Buddhistische Haus" in Berlin – Frohnau.

In December 1957 Asoka Weeraratna on behalf of the Trustees of the German Dharmaduta Society purchased the premises of "Das Buddhistische Haus" from the heirs of Dr. Dahlke. It is now a Centre for the spread of Theravada Buddhism in Europe. As the second oldest Buddhist institution in Europe, German authorities have designated it a National Heritage site.

== Present day ==
In 2015 the first Bhikkhunī ordination in Germany, the Theravādin bhikkhuni ordination of German nun Samaneri Dhira, occurred on 21 June at Anenja Vihara.

According to the Deutsche Buddhistische Union (German Buddhist Union), an umbrella organisation of the Buddhist groups in Germany, there are about 245,000 active Buddhists in Germany (as of 2005), 50% of them are Asian immigrants. They are organized in about 600 groups. In 1977 there were just 15 Buddhist groups.

== See also ==
- Buddhism in the West

== Bibliography ==
- Martin Baumann, Culture Contact and Valuation: Early German Buddhists and the Creation of a 'Buddhism in Protestant Shape', Numen 44 (3), 270–295 (1997)
- Martin Baumann, The transplantation of Buddhism to Germany: Processive modes and strategies of adaptation, Method and Theory in the Study of Religion 6 (1), 35–61 (1994) (registration required)
- Martin Baumann: Deutsche Buddhisten. Geschichte und Gemeinschaften, Marburg, 1993, 2nd updated and enlarged edition 1995.
- Hellmuth Hecker: Chronik des Buddhismus in Deutschland. 3. Aufl. Deutsche Buddhistische Union, Plochingen 1985
- Eva Neumaier-Dargyay, Is Buddhism like a tomato? Thoughts about the transplantation of Buddhism to Germany: A response to Martin Baumann, Method & Theory in the Study of Religion 7 (2), 185–194 (1995) {{registration required ]}}
- Klaus-Josef Notz: Der Buddhismus in Deutschland in seinen Selbstdarstellungen. Eine religionswissenschaftliche Untersuchung zur religiösen Akkulturationsproblematik. Lang, Frankfurt a.M. u.a. 1984.
- Jürgen Offermanns: Der lange Weg des Zen-Buddhismus nach Deutschland. Vom 16. Jahrhundert bis Rudolf Otto. Lunds Univ., Lund 2002, ISBN 91-22-01953-7
- Andrea Rübenacker: Buddha boomt. Eine inhaltsanalytische Untersuchung der im deutschen Fernsehen gesendeten Beiträge zum Thema "Buddhismus in Deutschland". Unter besonderer Berücksichtigung einer stofflichen Buddhismus-Betrachtung. Diss. Dortmund 2000.
- Eva Sabine Saalfrank: Geistige Heimat im Buddhismus aus Tibet. Eine empirische Studie am Beispiel der Kagyüpas in Deutschland. Farbri, Ulm 1997, ISBN 3-931997-05-7
- Volker Zotz: Auf den glückseligen Inseln. Buddhismus in der deutschen Kultur. Theseus, Berlin 2000 (ISBN 3-89620-151-4)
