= Religion in Berlin =

Religion in Berlin (2022)
1. Not religious/other (72.0%)
2. EKD Protestants (12.6%)
3. Catholics (7.30%)
4. Islam (4.00%)
5. Jewish (1.00%)
6. Other (0.50%)

More than 60 percent of Berlin residents have no registered religious affiliation. As of 2010, at least 30 percent of the population identified with some form of Christianity (18.7 percent Protestants, 9.1 percent Catholics and 2.7 percent other Christian), approximately 8.1 percent were Muslim, 1 percent were Jewish, and 1 percent belonged to other religions. As of 2022, the number of registered church members has shrunk to 15 percent for EKD Protestants and 9 percent for Catholics.

== Irreligion ==
Berlin has been called the "atheist capital of Europe" due to its low level of religious affiliation.

On 26 April 2009, a referendum (de) was held on whether Berlin pupils should be allowed to choose between the ethics class, a compulsory class introduced in all Berlin schools in 2006, and a religion class. The SPD, the Left Party and Greens supported the "Pro Ethics" camp for a "No" vote, stressing that the ethics class should remain compulsory, and pupils could voluntarily take an extra religion class alongside it if they so chose; the CDU and FDP supported the "Pro Reli" camp for a "Yes" vote, wanting to give pupils a free choice. In East Berlin, an overwhelming majority voted against the introduction of religious education. In total, 51.5 percent voted "No" and 48.4 percent voted "Yes".

There are a number of humanist groups in the city. The Humanistischer Verband Deutschlands (English: Humanist Association of Germany) is an organization to promote and spread a secular humanist worldview and an advocate for the rights of nonreligious people. It was founded 1993 in Berlin, and in 2009 according to the group it counted about 4100 members in the city.

== Christianity ==
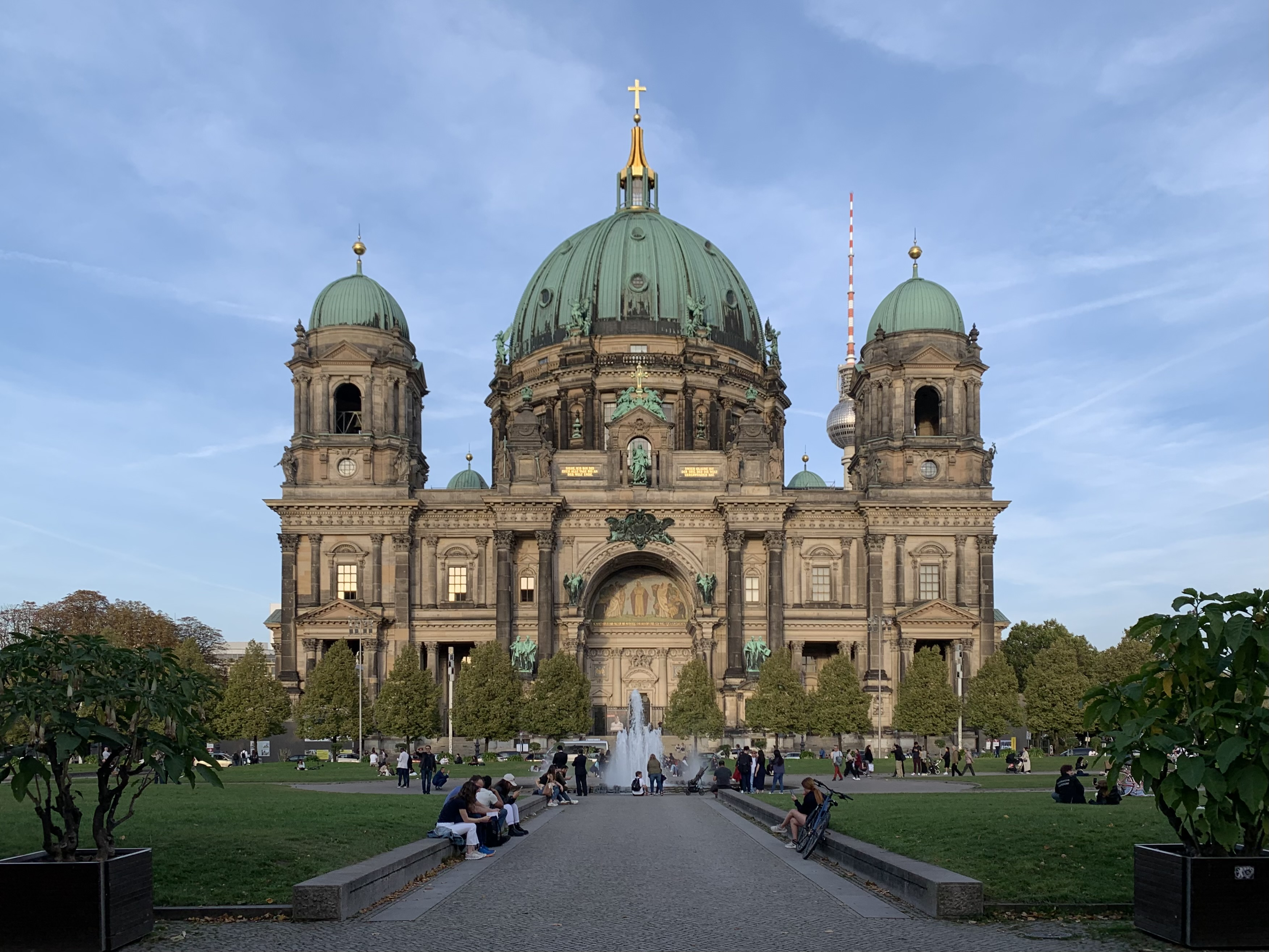
Berliner Dom, held by a congregation and the Protestant umbrella UEK

=== Protestant Church ===
The largest denominations are the Protestant regional church body of the Evangelical Church of Berlin-Brandenburg-Silesian Upper Lusatia (EKBO), a united church comprising mostly Lutheran, a few Reformed and United Protestant congregations. EKBO is a member of both the Protestant Church in Germany (EKD) and Union Evangelischer Kirchen (UEK) claiming 18.7 percent of the city's population.

Since 2010 the leader of the church has been bishop Dr. Markus Dröge. St. Mary's Church is the seat of the bishop of the EKBO with the Berlin Cathedral being under joint supervision of all the member churches of the UEK.

=== Roman Catholic Church ===
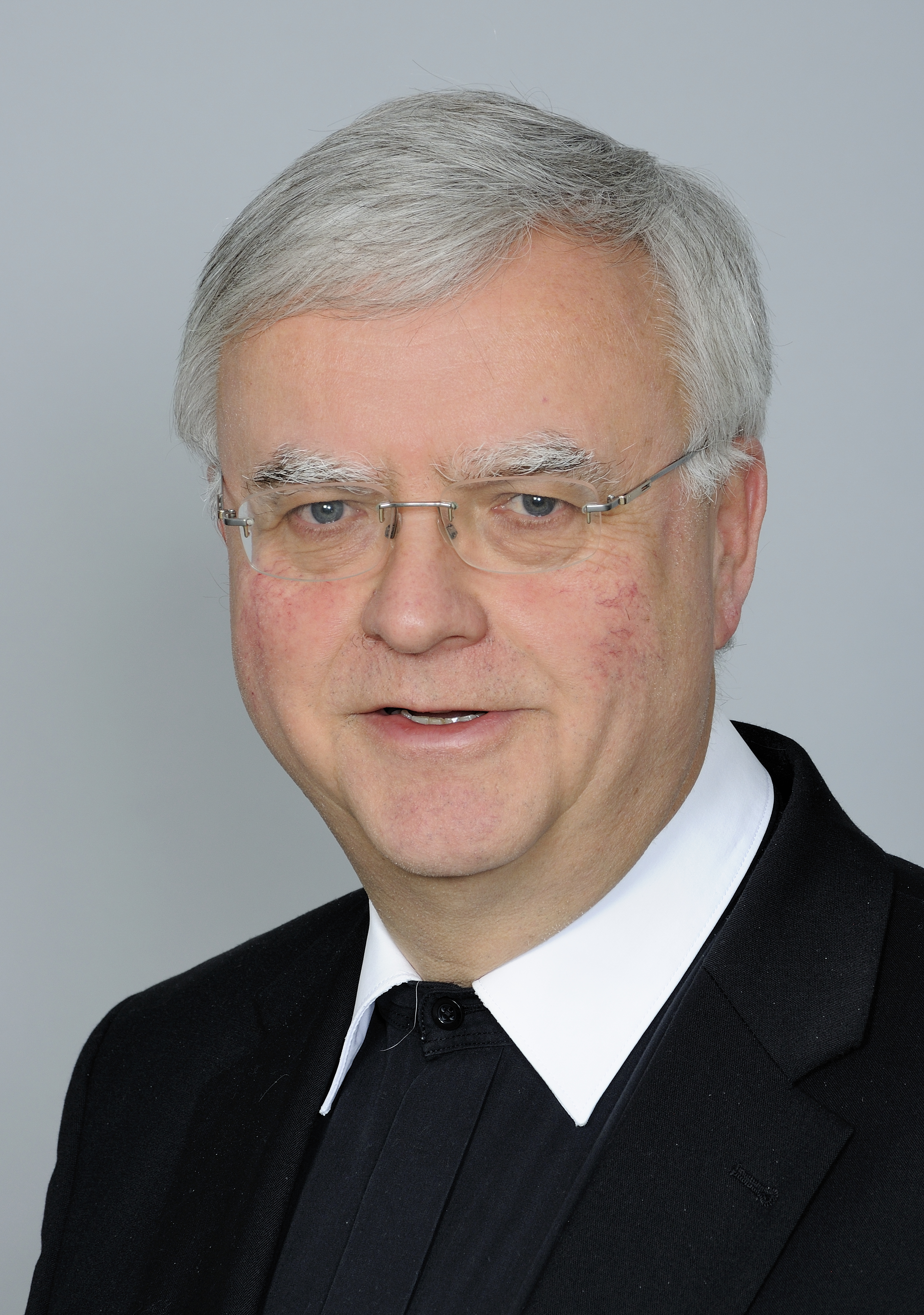
Archbishop Heiner Koch

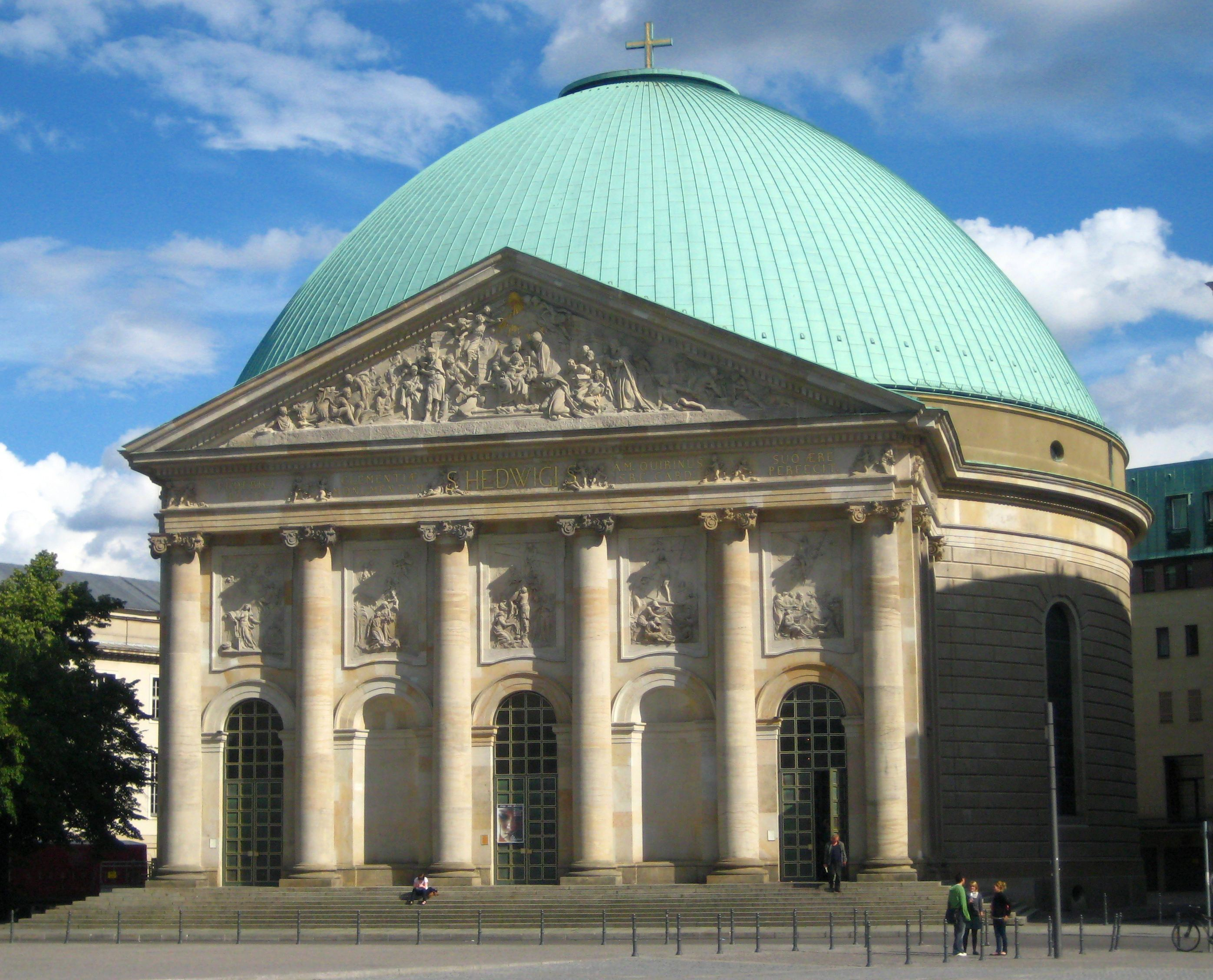
St. Hedwig's Cathedral

In 1994, Pope John Paul II elevated Berlin to the rank of an archdiocese, supervising since the simultaneously erected Diocese of Görlitz (formerly Apostolic Administration) and the prior exempt Diocese of Dresden-Meißen.

Berlin is the seat of the Roman Catholic Archdiocese of Berlin covering the northeast of Germany. In 2004 there were 386,279 Catholics out of the population of the archdiocese, which covered Berlin, most of Brandenburg (except of its southeastern corner, historical Lower Lusatia) and Hither Pomerania, i. e. the German part of Pomerania. A little over 6 percent of the population in this area was Roman Catholic. There are 122 parishes in the archdiocese. The Roman Catholic Church claimed 9.1 percent of the city's registered members in 2010.

The current archbishop is Heiner Koch, formerly Bishop of Dresden, who was appointed by Pope Francis on Monday, 8 June 2015, to replace the former archbishop, Cardinal Rainer Maria Woelki.

=== Orthodox Church ===
In 2010 about 2.7 percent of the population identified with other Christian denominations, mostly Eastern Orthodox. Berlin is also the seat of Orthodox cathedrals, such as the Cathedral of St. Boris the Baptist, one of the two seats of the Bulgarian Orthodox Diocese of Western and Central Europe, and the Resurrection of Christ Cathedral of the Diocese of Berlin (Patriarchate of Moscow).

== Islam ==
In 2009, Islamic religious organizations in Berlin reported 249,000 members. As of the end of 2015, 352,667 officially registered residents of Berlin had immigrated after 1955 from Arabic and Islamic countries, the largest part from Turkey, or were children of such immigrants.

The Berlin Mosque (German: Berliner Moschee, Wilmersdorfer Moschee, Ahmadiyya Moschee) in Berlin is Germany's oldest mosque in use, situated on Brienner Straße 7–8 in Berlin-Wilmersdorf. It was designed by K. A. Hermann and was built between 1923 and 1925. It has two 90 feet (27 m) tall minarets.

The Sehitlik Mosque in Neukölln built in 1983 serves as a cultural center as well as a place of worship. It can hold up to 1,500 people, and is the largest Islamic mosque in Berlin.

== Judaism ==
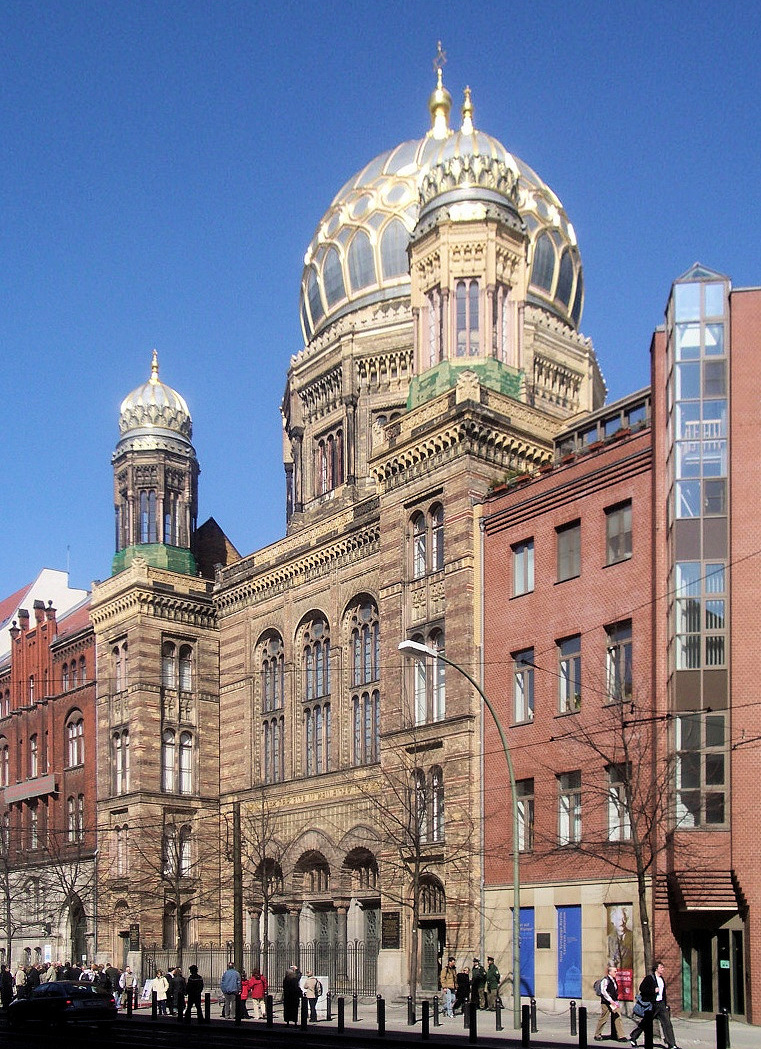
Neue Synagoge. Since 1990 Berlin has a constantly growing Jewish community.

Of the estimated population of 30,000-45,000 Jewish residents in 2014, approximately 12,000 are registered members of religious organizations. Berlin is considered to have one of the rapidly growing Jewish communities in the world due to Russian, Eastern European, Israeli and German Jewish immigrants.

The Centrum Judaicum and several synagogues—including the largest in Germany—have been renovated and reopened in 2007. Berlin's annual week of Jewish culture and the Jewish Cultural Festival in Berlin, held for the 21st time in the same year, featuring concerts, exhibitions, public readings and discussions partially explain why Rabbi Yitzhak Ehrenberg of the orthodox Jewish community in Berlin states: "Orthodox Jewish life is alive in Berlin again."

The Neue Synagoge ("New Synagogue") was built 1859–1866 as the main synagogue of the Berlin Jewish community, on Oranienburger Straße. Because of its refined Moorish style and resemblance to the Alhambra, it became an important architectural monument of the second half of the 19th century in the city.

== Buddhism ==
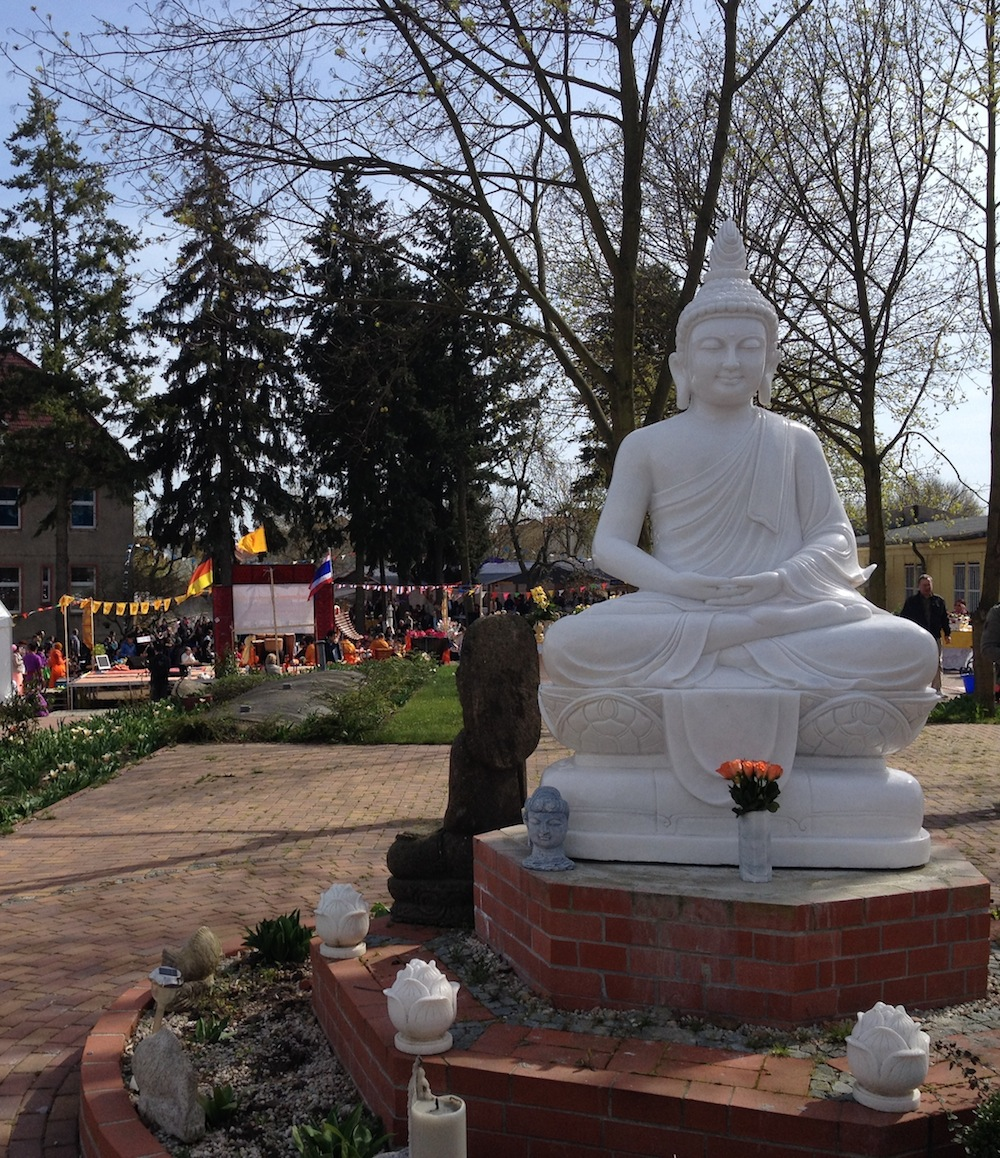
Thai Buddhist temple Wat Buddha Vihara in Berlin-Pankow

In 1924 Dr. Paul Dahlke established the first German Buddhist monastery, the "Das Buddhistische Haus" in Reinickendorf. It is considered to be the oldest and largest Theravada Buddhist center in Europe and has been declared a National Heritage site.

The first Thai Buddhist temple in Berlin, Wat Buddhavihara (Thai: วัดพุทธวิหาร, RTGS: wat phuttha wihan) was opened on 16 April 1995. Located in Berlin-Pankow, the temple is run by the Thai Buddhist Association Berlin and was built under the patronage of monk Phra Phrom Wachira Panyachan, the abbot of Wat Ratchaorasaram in Bangkok.

== Places of worship ==
There are many places of worship in Berlin for a variety of religions and denominations not listed above. For example, there are 36 Baptist congregations (within Union of Evangelical Free Church Congregations in Germany), 29 New Apostolic Churches, 15 United Methodist churches, eight Free Evangelical Congregations, four Churches of Christ, Scientist (1st, 2nd, 3rd, and 11th), six congregations of the Church of Jesus Christ of Latter-day Saints (Mormons), an Old Catholic church and even an Anglican church. The Independent Evangelical Lutheran Church has eight parishes of different sizes in Berlin. Berlin has more than 80 mosques, as well as two Buddhist and three Hindu temples.

== Interfaith initiatives ==
Over the past years, Berlin has seen a considerable increase in interfaith initiatives, including the House of One project which looks at building a joint place of worship for adherents to different religions. In 2016, Berlin celebrated its first ever Interfaith Music Festival ("Festival der Religionen") which was organised by the international non-profit initiative Faiths in Tune and made possible with funds from the Berlin Lottery Foundation.

The Festival der Religionen combined live music and dance performances by artists from 13 different religions, an interfaith fair and several exhibitions on faith subjects.

== See also ==
- Religion in Germany
