= Paul Dahlke =

Paul Dahlke may refer to:

- Paul Dahlke (Buddhist) (1865–1928), German physician and one of the founders of Buddhism in Germany
- Paul Dahlke (actor) (1904–1984), German stage and film actor
