= German Dharmaduta Society =

German non-profit organisation

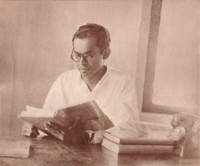
Asoka Weeraratna - Founder of the German Dharmaduta Society

The German Dharmaduta Society is an organization established to promote Buddhism in Germany and other Western Countries, and was founded by Asoka Weeraratna, in Colombo, Sri Lanka on 21 September 1952.

== History ==
The idea of forming a Society to propagate Buddhism in Germany and other western countries dawned on Asoka Weeraratna, then a young businessman dealing in jewellery and Swiss wristwatches, while he was on his first business visit to Germany in 1951. Asoka Weeraratna became aware of the spiritual hunger in Germany, which was slowly recovering from total devastation due to the Second World War, and the search for an alternative moral and spiritual philosophy, that placed a very high emphasis on peace and non-violence. On his return from West Germany and convinced of the potential for growth of Buddhism in that country, Weeraratna established the Lanka Dhammaduta Society on 21 September 1952, which was later renamed the German Dharmaduta Society (GDS). Ven. Ñânatiloka Mahâthera, the well known German Scholar monk was the first Patron of the Society.

In 1953, Weeraratna, by this time the Honorary Secretary of the Society, on his second visit to Germany, made a survey of Buddhist activities in that country and published his investigations in a report entitled 'Buddhism in Germany'. The Society in 1954 launched the Million Rupee Fund under the patronage of Dudley Senanayake, the former Prime Minister, to collect funds for the permanent establishment of the Buddha Sâsana in Germany, as Arahant Mahinda had done it in Sri Lanka.

With growing public support, the Society soon won the recognition and encouragement of the State and the Million Rupee Fund was declared an Approved Charity by the Government. Among the many benefactors who contributed to this Fund, particular mention must be made of Walther Schmits, a German Buddhist, who left a valuable legacy of DM 550.000 to the Society. In 1955 the Government granted to the Society an acre of vacant crown land in Bullers Road, Colombo on a 99-year-old lease. In August 1956, Hon. S.W.R.D. Bandaranaike, Prime Minister, declared open at a ceremonial public meeting, amidst a large gathering, the newly built Headquarters and Training Centre of the Society at 417, Bullers Road (Bauddhaloka Mawatha), Colombo 7 consisting of a two-storied dormitory of 14 rooms, an Assembly Hall, Office and Library, built at a cost of Rs. 125.000.

Eight prominent Buddhist monks led by the German monk Ven. Ñânatiloka Mahâthera and including Ven. Balangoda Ânanda Maitreyya, Ven. Galle Anuruddha, Ven. Akuretiye Amaravamsa, Ven. Ñânaponika Thera (German), Ven. Kudawella Vangîsa and Ven. Vappo (German) were attached to the Centre. These monks offered their services to train German Buddhists and others in the study of Buddhist philosophy. Friedrich Möller, a teacher from Hamburg and the first German recruit of the Society, arrived in Sri Lanka in 1953. He completed his period of training and received ordination under the name of Bhikkhu Ñânavimala.

The Society sponsored the first Buddhist Mission to Germany, which left the Colombo Harbour by ship SS Orantes on June 15, 1957. The three monks in this historic mission comprised Ven. Soma, Ven. Kheminda and Ven. Vinîta. They were all recruited from the Vajiraramaya Temple, Bambalapitiya. A few weeks later Asoka Weeraratna left Colombo by airplane and joined this Mission in Germany. He spent about five months in Germany and was able to purchase Das Buddhistische Haus from the heirs of its founder, Dr. Paul Dahlke. This Buddhist Haus was built in 1923 and considered the center of German Buddhism during Dr. Dahlke's time. After its 1957 purchase it was converted into a Buddhist Vihâra by the Society by providing residential facilities to Buddhist Dharmaduta monks drawn mainly from Sri Lanka.

Since 1957 there has been a stream of Buddhist monks from Sri Lanka and other countries, taking up residence in the Berlin Buddhist Vihâra. Of these dedicated monks, special mention must be made of Ven. Athurugiriye Ñânavimala Mahâthera who served as the Vihâradhipati of the Berlin Vihâra for a period of 15 years (1966–1981). These monks teach the Buddha Dhamma and give instruction on meditation to Germans and people of other nationalities seeking a philosophy that places an emphasis on self-reliance, non-violence and loving kindness to all living beings.

Ven. Bhikkhu Bodhi who visited the Berlin Vihâra in May 2002 and was impressed with the self-sacrificing work of the resident monks and lay volunteers has said in a Message of Goodwill to the GDS on the occasion of the commemoration of its 50th anniversary (1952–2002) that:

The interest in Theravâda Buddhism, as the oldest historical form of Buddhism, continues to grow in the West, and thus the (Berlin) Vihâra has ahead of it enormous scope for development. As a student and friend of the late German monk, Ven. Ñânaponika Mahâthera, I have a special concern to see Theravâda Buddhism send down strong roots in Germany.
