= Soma Thera =

Sri Lankan Buddhist monk, translator and missionary

Kotahene Soma Maha Thera (23 December 1898 – 23 February 1960), born as Victor Emmanuel Perera Pulle in Kotahena, Colombo, was a Theravada Buddhist monk, translator and missionary.

== Childhood ==
Soma Thera was raised as a Sinhalese Catholic and received his education at the Catholic St. Benedict's College in Kotahena, but became a Buddhist in his teenage years after reading the Dhammapada.

== Ordination and travels ==
In 1934, he went to Japan with his friend G.S. Prelis (later ordained as Kheminda Thera) and translated the Chinese version of the Vimuttimagga into English, which was published as The Path of Freedom. In 1936, both Victor Perera and Prelis went to Burma and received the higher ordination as Theravada Buddhist monks on 6 November 1936 in Moulmein under the meditation teacher Jetavana Sayadaw.

During World War II, Soma Thera stayed at the Island Hermitage with Kheminda Thera and Nyanaponika Thera.

== Missionary activities and publications ==
Despite suffering from asthma, Soma Thera participated in a mission trip to India in 1940 as a member of the Buddhist Mission of Goodwill. Soma Thera also took part in another mission trip to Germany in 1957, which was sponsored by the German Dharmaduta Society, during the period when the society acquired Das Buddhistische Haus (The Buddhist House) in Berlin, founded by Dr. Paul Dahlke. Soma Thera authored many books which was related to Buddhism and was an author of the Buddhist Publication Society, writing several booklets for the Bodhi Leaves and The Wheel series.

Soma Thera died in 1960 due to pulmonary thrombosis.

== Works ==
- *Thera, Soma; Thera, Kheminda; Ehara, N.R.M. (1961), The Path of Freedom (Vimuttimagga), Buddhist Publication Society
- Thera, Soma (1962), An Old Debate on Self, Buddhist Publication Society
- Thera, Soma (1965), Treasures of the Noble, Buddhist Publication Society
- Thera, Soma (1974), Contribution of Buddhism to World Culture, Buddhist Publication Society
- Thera, Soma (1975), The Buddha's Teachings: A Clear and Practical Message, Buddhist Publication Society
- Thera, Soma (1976), The Buddhist Layman's Code of Discipline, Buddhist Publication Society
- Thera, Soma (1978), Words Leading to Disenchantment & Samsara: Two Essays, Buddhist Publication Society
- Thera, Soma (1981), Kalama Sutta: The Buddha's Charter of Free Inquiry, Buddhist Publication Society
- Thera, Soma (1981), The Removal of Distracting Thoughts: Vitakka Santhana Sutta, Buddhist Publication Society
- Thera, Soma; Thera, Piyadassi (1982), Lamp of the Law, Buddhist Publication Society
- Thera, Soma (1998), The Way of Mindfulness: The Satipatthana Sutta and Its Commentary, Buddhist Publication Society, ISBN 978-9552402562
- Thera, Soma, The Buddha's First Discourse, Buddhist Publication Society
