= Pariyatti (bookstore) =

Nonprofit organization focused on Theravadan tradition in Onalaska, Washington, US

Pariyatti is a nonprofit organization focused on the Theravadan tradition, based in Onalaska, Washington. It publishes, distributes, sells and donates books and media devoted to the teachings of the Buddha. It has been called "North America's leading source of books for students of the Theravadan tradition" by Tricycle: The Buddhist Review.

The Pariyatti bookstore (both online and brick-and-mortar) carries almost 900 print titles. Pariyatti also provides a number of services through its website, including access to classic texts that are out of print, podcasts, and emailed "Daily Words of the Buddha".

Pariyatti is the sole distributor in North America of books published by the Sri Lanka–based Buddhist Publication Society (BPS) and the sole distributor in the Americas of books published by the London-based Pali Text Society (PTS), including the Tipitaka, the standard collection of scriptures in the Theravada Buddhist tradition – also known as the Pāli Canon. It also carries titles from other publishers, including publications from the Vipassana Research Institute (VRI) and Motilal Banarsidass, both based in India.

Pariyatti has published more than 30 titles, including those under its own imprint and reprints of selected titles published by VRI and BPS.

== History ==
Pariyatti originated as a home-based mail order service established by a Vipassana meditator in Northern California in 1984 to enable fellow meditators in the West to buy books that support the practice of Vipassana meditation in the tradition of S. N. Goenka and Sayagyi U Ba Khin. Independent of that effort, Vipassana Research Publications of America (VRPA) was launched in 1995 by a second meditator, with the encouragement of Goenka, to make publications from VRI available in the West. The two entities were combined in 1996 and eventually became known as Pariyatti, which is a word in the Pali language roughly meaning the intellectual background or theoretical understanding of the teachings of the Buddha.
