= Nyanatiloka =

German Buddhist monk (1878–1957)

Nyanatiloka Mahathera
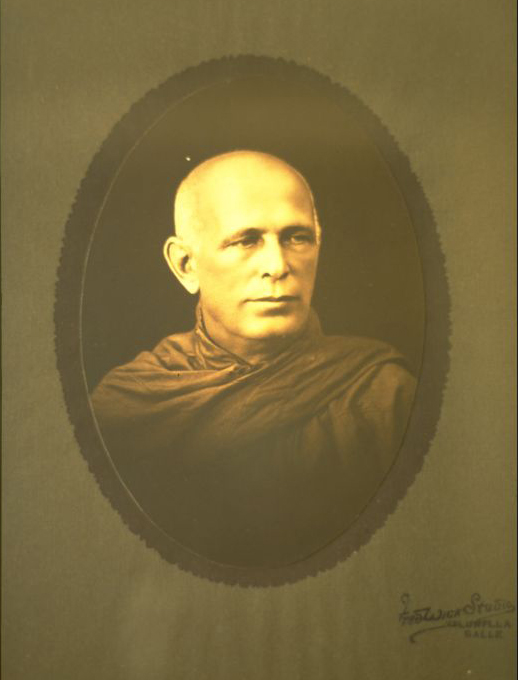
- Nyanatiloka Mahathera
- Title: Mahathera (Great Elder)

Personal life
- Born: Anton Walther Florus Gueth; 10 February 1878 Wiesbaden, German Empire
- Died: 28 May 1957 (aged 79) Colombo, Dominion of Ceylon
- Occupation: monk; teacher; translator; scholar

Religious life
- Religion: Buddhist
- School: Theravada
- Lineage: Amarapura Nikaya

Senior posting
- Based in: Island Hermitage
- Students: Nyanaponika Thera, Silacara, Lama Anagarika Govinda, Paul Debes, Nyanamoli, Nyanavira, Nyanavimala

Ven. Nyanatiloka (Ñāṇatiloka) Mahathera (19 February 1878 – 28 May 1957) born as Anton Walther Florus Gueth, was one of the earliest Westerners in modern times to become a Bhikkhu, a fully ordained Buddhist monk.

== Early life and education ==
Nyanatiloka was born on 19 February 1878 in Wiesbaden, Germany, as Anton Walther Florus Gueth. His father was Anton Gueth, a professor and principal of the municipal Gymnasium of Wiesbaden, as well as a private councillor. His mother's name was Paula Auffahrt. She had studied piano and singing at the Royal Court Theatre in Kassel.

He studied at the Königliche Realgymnasium (Royal Gymnasium) in Wiesbaden from 1888 to 1896. From 1896 to 1898 he received private tuition in music theory and composition, and in playing the violin, piano, viola and clarinet. From 1889 to 1900 he studied theory and composition of music as well as the playing of the violin and piano at Hoch’sches Conservatorium (Hoch Conservatory) in Frankfurt. From 1900 to 1902 he studied composition under Charles-Marie Widor at the Music Academy of Paris (Paris Conservatoire).

His childhood was happy. As a child Nyanatiloka had a great love of nature, of solitude in the forest, and of religious philosophical thought. He was brought up as a Catholic and as a child and adolescent he was quite devout. He went to church every evening and absorbed himself in the book The Imitation of Christ by Thomas à Kempis. As a child he wanted to become a Christian missionary in Africa and as an adolescent he ran away from home to become a Benedictine monk at Maria-Laach monastery but soon returned. From then on his "belief in a personal God gradually transformed into a kind of pantheism" and was inspired by the prevailing atmosphere of weltschmerz (world-weariness). From the age of seventeen he was a vegetarian and abstained from drinking and smoking.

Around the age of fifteen he began to have an "almost divine veneration for great musicians, particularly composers, regarding them as the manifestation of what is most exalted and sublime" and made friends with musical child prodigies. He composed orchestral pieces and in 1897 his first composition called "Legende" ("Legend") was played by the Kurhaus Orchestra of Wiesbaden.

At about the same time he conceived a great love for philosophy. He studied Plato's Phaedo, Descartes, Kant's Critique of Pure Reason, von Hartmann and especially Schopenhauer. He also had a great interest for languages, foreign countries and peoples. While visiting a vegetarian restaurant he heard Theosophical lecturer Edwin Böhme give a talk on Buddhism which made him immediately an enthusiastic Buddhist. The following day his violin teacher gave him Buddhist Catechism by Subhadra Bhikshu and another book on Buddhism that gave him the desire to become a Buddhist monk in Asia. After studying composition with the well-known composer Charles-Marie Widor in Paris, he played in various orchestras in France, Algeria, and Turkey. In 1902, intending to become a Buddhist monk in India, he travelled from Thessaloniki to Cairo by way of Palestine. After earning the necessary money by playing violin in Cairo, Port Said and Bombay, he travelled to Sri Lanka.

== Early years as a Buddhist monk ==
In 1903, at the age of 25, Nyanatiloka briefly visited Sri Lanka and then proceeded to Burma to meet the English Buddhist monk Bhikkhu Ananda Metteyya. In Burma he was ordained as a Theravada Buddhist novice (samanera) at the Nga Htat Kyi Pagoda under Venerable U Asabha Thera in September 1903. As a novice he first stayed with Ananda Metteyya for a month in the same room.

In January or February 1904 he received full acceptance into the Sangha (upasampada) with U Kumara Mahathera as preceptor (upajjhaya) and became a bhikkhu with the name of Ñāṇatiloka. Although his preceptor was a renowned Abhidhamma reciter, he learned Pali and Abhidhamma mostly by himself. Later in 1904 he visited Singapore, perhaps with the intention to visit the Irish monk U Dhammaloka. At the end of 1904 he left Rangoon to go to Upper Burma together with the Indian monk Kosambi Dhammananda, the later Harvard scholar Dharmananda Damodar Kosambi. In a cave in the Sagaing Mountains they practised concentration and insight meditation under the instructions of a monk who was reputed to be an Arahant.

Desiring to deepen his study of Pali and the Pāli scriptures, he went to Sri Lanka in 1905. In 1905–06 Nyanatiloka stayed with the Siamese prince monk Jinavaravamsa, (layname Prince Prisdang Jumsai, who had earlier been the first Siamese Ambassador for Europe) in palm leaf huts on the small island of Galgodiyana near Matara, which Jinavaravamsa called Culla-Lanka ("Small Lanka"). Pictures of Nyanatiloka and Jinavaravamsa taken at this monastery suggest that they were doing meditation of the nature of the body by way of observing skeletons or were contemplating death.

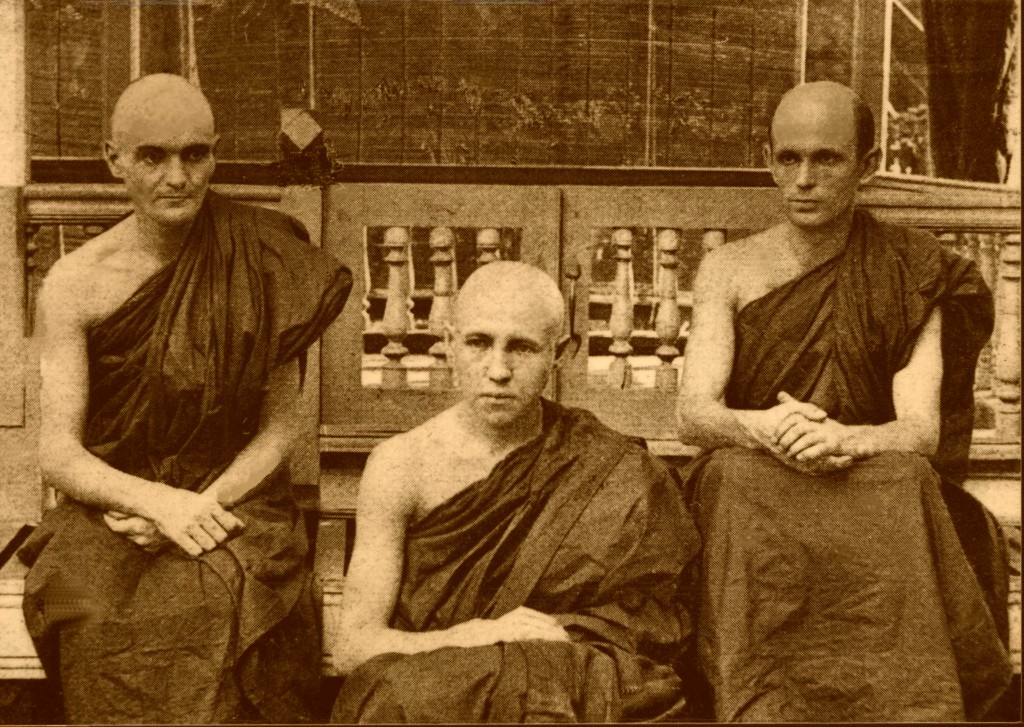
Silacara, Dhammanusari, and Nyanatiloka, Burma, 1907

At Culla-Lanka Nyanatiloka ordained two laymen as novices (samanera). The Dutchman Frans Bergendahl, the troubled son of a rich merchant, was given the name Suñño and the German Fritz Stange was given the name Sumano. In the summer of 1906 Nyanatiloka returned to Germany to visit his parents. Sumana, who was suffering from tuberculosis (consumption) and had to get treatment, also went with him. They returned to Sri Lanka in October.

At the end of 1906 Nyanatiloka returned to Burma alone, where he continued to work on translating the Anguttara Nikaya. He stayed at Kyundaw Kyaung, near Rangoon, in a residence built for Ananda Metteyya and him by the rich Burmese lady Mrs Hla Oung. He also stayed in Maymo in the high country. At Kyundaw Kyaung, he gave the novice acceptance to the Scotsman J.F. McKechnie, who got the Pali name Sasanavamsa. This name was changed to Sīlācāra at his higher ordination. Nyanatiloka also gave the going forth (pabbajjā) to the German Walter Markgraf, under the name Dhammanusari, who soon disrobed and returned to Germany. Markgraf became a Buddhist publisher and founded the German Pali Society (Deutsche Pali Gesellschaft), of which Nyanatiloka became the Honorary President.

In 1906, Nyanatiloka published his first Buddhist work in German, Das Wort des Buddha, a short anthology of the Buddha's discourses arranged by way of the framework of the Four Noble Truths. Its English translation, The Word of the Buddha became one of the most popular modern Buddhist works. It has appeared in many editions and was translated into several languages. Nyanatiloka also started on his translation of the Aṅguttara Nikaya. He gave his first public talk, on the Four Noble Truths, in 1907. It was given on a platform in front of the Pagoda of Moulmein. Nyanatiloka spoke in Pali and a Burmese Pali expert translated.

== Plans for a Theravada Buddhist monastery in Europe ==
Upon returning to Germany, Markgraf planned to found a Buddhist Monastery in the southern part of Switzerland and formed a group to realise this aim. Enrico Bignani, the publisher of Coenobium: Rivista Internazionale di Liberi Studi from Lugano had found a solitary alpine hut at the foot of Monte Lema Mountain, near the village of Novaggio overlooking Lake Maggiore, and Nyanatiloka left Burma for Novaggio at the end of 1909 or the beginning of 1910. The architect Rutch from Breslau had already designed a monastery with huts for monks, and the plan was that Bhikkhu Sīlācāra and other disciples were to join Nyanatiloka there. Nyanatiloka's stay and plans drew a lot of attention from the press and several journalists visited him to write about him and the planned monastery. However, Nyanatiloka suffered heavily from bronchitis and malnutrition, and after half a year left Novaggio with the German monk candidate Ludwig Stolz, who had joined him at Novaggio, to try to find a better place in Italy or North Africa. In Novaggio he worked on his Pali-grammatik (Pali Grammar) and his translation of the Abhidhamma text called Puggalapaññatti (Human Types).

== Italy, Tunisia, Lausanne ==
In Italy, Nyanatiloka first stayed with a lawyer in a town near Turin. After the lawyer tried to persuade Nyanatiloka and his companion Stolz to make harmoniums to make their living, they left to Rome, where they stayed with the music teacher Alessandro Costa. From Rome they went to Naples and took a ship to Tunis, where they stayed with Alexandra David-Néel and her husband for a week. Then they went on Gabès, where they were told to leave Tunisia by policemen. After visiting David-Néel again, they left for Lausanne, where they stayed with Monsieur Rodolphe-Adrien Bergier (1852-?) in his Buddhist hermitage called "Caritas". At Caritas, the glass painter Bartel Bauer was accepted by Nyanatiloka as a novice called Koññañño. Soon after Koññañño left to Sri Lanka for further training, the American-German Friedrich Beck and a young German called Spannring came to Caritas. After two more unsuccessful visits to Italy in search of a suitable place for a monastery, Nyanatiloka, Spannring, Stolz, Beck, and perhaps also Bergier, left to Sri Lanka from Genoa on 26 April 1911 to found a monastery there.

== Founding of the Island Hermitage ==
After arriving at Sri Lanka, Nyanatiloka stayed in a hall built for Koññañño in Galle. Ludwig Stolz was given novice ordination at a nearby monastery and given the name Vappo. From Koññañño, Nyanatiloka heard about an abandoned jungle island in a lagoon at the nearby village of Dodanduva that would be a suitable place for a hermitage. After inspecting the snake-infested island and getting approval of the local population, five simple wooden huts were built. Just before the beginning of the annual monk's rainy season retreat (vassa) of 1911 (which would have been started the day after the full moon of July), Nyanatiloka and his companions moved to the Island. The hermitage was named Island Hermitage. The island was bought by Bergier in 1914 from its Burgher owner and donated to Nyanatiloka. In September 1911 Alexandra David-Néel came and studied Pali under Nyanatiloka at the Island Hermitage while staying with the monastery's chief supporter, Coroner Wijeyesekera. Visitors such as Anagarika Dhammapala and the German ambassador visited the Island Hermitage during this period. Several Westerners—four Germans, an American-German, an American, and an Austrian—were ordained at the Island Hermitage between 1911 and 1914.

In 1913 Nyanatiloka started a mission for the Sri Lankan "outcastes," Rodiya, beginning in the area of Kadugannava, west of Kandy. Some of the Rodiya lived and studied on the Island Hermitage. The son of the Rodiya chieftain was accepted by Nyanatiloka as a novice with the name Ñaṇaloka. After the death of Nyanatiloka he became the abbot of the Island Hermitage.

== Sikkim ==
Nyanatiloka travelled to Sikkim in 1914 with the intention to travel on to Tibet. In Gangtok he met the Sikkimese scholar translator Kazi Dawa Samdup and the Maharaja. He then travelled on to Tumlong monastery where Alexandra David-Néel and Sīlācāra were staying, and returned to Gangtong the next day. Because of running out of finances Nyanatiloka had to return to Ceylon. He returned to Sri Lanka accompanied by two Tibetans, who became monks at the Island Hermitage.

== World War I ==
In 1914, with the outbreak of World War I, Nyanatiloka, along with all Germans in British colonies, was interned by the British. First he was allowed to stay at the Island Hermitage, but he was even eventually interned in the concentration camp at Diyatalawa. From there he was deported to Australia in 1915, where he mostly stayed at the prison camp at Trial Bay. He was released in 1916 on the condition that he would return to Germany. Instead, he traveled by way of Hawaii to China in order to reach the Theravada Buddhist Burmese tribal areas near the Burmese border, where he hoped to stay, since he could not stay in Burma or Sri Lanka. After China joined the war against Germany, he was interned in China and was repatriated to Germany in 1919.

== Japan ==
In 1920, after being denied re-entry into British ruled Sri Lanka and other British colonies in Asia, Nyanatiloka went to Japan with his German disciples Bhikkhu Vappo (Ludwig Stolz) and Sister Uppalavaṇṇā (Else Buchholz). He taught Pali and German at Japanese universities for five years, including at Taisho University, where he was assisted by Ekai Kawaguchi, and at Komazawa University, where he taught with President Yamagami Sogen (山上曹源), who had also studied Pali in Sri Lanka. He also met with Japanese Theravada monks, but could not stay in any monasteries in Japan. Nyanatiloka continued working on his translations of Pali texts during this period. In 1921 he visited Java, where he contracted malaria, and Thailand, where he apparently hoped to stay since it was a Theravada Buddhist country. Although he was given a pass and visa by the Thai ambassador in Japan, he was arrested in Thailand on suspicions of being a spy, was deported after a few weeks, and returned to Japan.

== Return to Sri Lanka and Island Hermitage ==
In 1926, the British allowed Nyanatiloka and his other German disciples to return to Sri Lanka. The Island Hermitage, which had been uninhabited for many years, was overgrown by the jungle and had to be rebuilt. The period from 1926 to 1939 was the period during which the Island Hermitage flourished most. Scholars, spiritual seekers, adventurers, diplomats and high ranking figures such as the former King of Saxony visited and stayed during this period. Anagarika Govinda, the future Lama Govinda, came in 1928, and with Nyanatiloka founded the International Buddhist Union (IBU), which stopped functioning after Govinda converted to Tibetan Mahayana and Vajirayana Buddhism a few years later.

During the period from 1931 to 1939 there were many ordinations at the Island Hermitage, mostly of Germans. Nyanaponika (Sigmund Feniger), who became a well known Buddhist writer and scholar, and Nyanakhetta (Peter Schönfeldt), who later became a Hindu Swami called Gauribala, ordained as novices in 1936 and as bhikkhus in 1937. They both had a German Jewish background. All applicants for ordination were taught Pali by Nyanatiloka, who considered a working knowledge of Pali indispensable for a proper understanding of Theravada Buddhism, since the translations of Buddhist texts at that time were often faulty.

== World War II ==
In 1939, with the British declaration of war against Nazi Germany, Nyanatiloka and other German-born Sri Lankans were again interned, first again at Diyatalawa Garrison in Sri Lanka and then in India (1941) at the large internment camp at Dehradun.

== Last Years, 1946–1957 ==
In 1946, Nyanatiloka and his German disciples were permitted by the British to return to Sri Lanka, where they again stayed at the Island Hermitage. In 1949 the well known Western Buddhist monks, Nanamoli, Nyanavira were ordained under Nyanatiloka. In December 1950, Nyanatiloka became a citizen of the newly independent Ceylon. For health reasons he moved to the Forest Hermitage in Kandy in 1951. Vappo and Nyanaponika soon followed him.

In 1954, Nyanatiloka and his disciple Nyanaponika were the only two Western-born monks invited to participate in the Sixth Buddhist council in Yangon, Burma. Nyanaponika read out Nyanatiloka's message at the opening of the council.

Nyanatiloka also served as the first Patron of the Lanka Dhammaduta Society (later renamed as the German Dharmaduta Society) which was founded by Asoka Weeraratna in Colombo, Sri Lanka on 21 Sept. 1952. Nyanatiloka attended and spoke at the Public Meeting held at Ananda College, Colombo on 30 May 1953 which was presided by Hon. C.W.W.Kannangara, then Minister of Local Government, to make public the findings of the survey carried out by Asoka Weeraratna (Founder and Hony. Secretary of the Lanka Dhammaduta Society) on the current state of Buddhist activities in Germany and the prospects for sending a Buddhist Mission to Germany before the Buddha Jayanthi celebrations in 1956. Nyanatiloka's Message to the Society dated 25 May 1953 contained in a Booklet entitled ' Buddhism in Germany ' by Asoka Weeraratna, was distributed at this Meeting, which was largely attended and comprised a very representative gathering of leading Buddhists.

Nyanatiloka also resided temporarily at a new Training Centre for Buddhist Missionary work in Germany that was opened by the Lanka Dhammaduta Society in Dalugama, Kelaniya in 1953. Ven. Ñânaponika (German) and the (then) newly arrived Upasaka Friedrich Möller from Germany were also temporarily resident together with Nyanatiloka at this Training Centre. Friedrich Möller was the last disciple of Nyanatiloka. At the age of forty-three, Möller was accepted as a novice by Nyaṇatiloka on 19 September 1955, taking the Pāli name Ñāṇavimala. He was later known as Ven. Polgasduwe Ñāṇavimala Thera.

== Death ==
Nyanatiloka died on 28 May 1957 in Colombo, Sri Lanka. He was 79 years old. At that time Nyanatiloka was resident at the Sanghavasa located on the newly opened premises of the German Dharmaduta Society at 417, Bullers Road (later known as Bauddhaloka Mawatha), Colombo 07. This was his last place of residence prior to his death. He was given a state funeral which had the then Prime Minister of Sri Lanka, Hon. S.W.R.D Bandaranaike delivering the funeral oration. The proceedings of the funeral were broadcast live over Radio Ceylon and a memorial stone was erected for him.

== Biography ==
The English translation of Nyanatiloka's German autobiography – covering his life from his childhood Germany to his return to Ceylon in 1926 after banishment; finished by Nyanatiloka in 1948, but probably based on a draft written in 1926 - was published as part of The Life of Nyanatiloka: The Biography of a Western Buddhist Pioneer (written and compiled by Bhikkhu Nyanatusita and Hellmuth Hecker, BPS, Kandy, 2009 View online.) This comprehensive biography contains an introduction, large bibliography, list of disciples, biography of Nyanaponika, photographs, and detailed information on the early history of early German and Western Buddhism.

== Work ==
English titles by Nyanatiloka:

- Word of the Buddha: an Outline of the Ethico-philosophical System of the Buddha in the Words of the Pali Canon (1906, 1927, 1967 (14th ed.), 1981, 2001) freely available online
- Guide through the Abhidhamma-Pitaka (1938, 1957, 1971, 1983, 2009)
- Buddhist Dictionary : Manual of Buddhist Terms and Doctrines (1952, 1956, 1972, 1980, 1988, 1997, 2004)
- Buddha's Path to Deliverance : a Systematic Exposition in the Words of the Sutta Pitaka (1952, 1959, 1969, 1982, 2000)
- Fundamentals of Buddhism: Four Lectures (1994)
- Influence of Buddhism on a People (Bodhi Leaves No. 2)
- Significance of Dependent Origination (Wheel Publication No. 140)

Autobiography and biography

- The Life of Nyanatiloka: The Biography of a Western Buddhist Pioneer Bhikkhu Nyanatusita and Hellmuth Hecker (Kandy, 2009)View online.

Nyanatiloka also translated important Theravadin Pali texts into German including:

- the Anguttara Nikaya
- the Dhammapada
- the Milindapañha
- the Puggalapannatti
- the Visuddhimagga.
- the Abhidhammatthasangaha.

In German he also wrote a Pali grammar, an anthology, and a Buddhist dictionary.

== See also ==
- Island Hermitage
- Nyanaponika Thera - German Theravada Buddhist monk and co-founder of the Buddhist Publication Society.
- Nanamoli Bhikkhu - British Theravada Buddhist monk and translator of Pali literature.
- Nanavira Thera - British Theravada Buddhist monk.
- U Dhammaloka - Irish Theravada Buddhist monk, ordained in Burma (1900).
- Lokanatha - Italian Buddhist monk and missionary.
- Sīlācāra - ordained as Theravada Buddhist monk in 1906.
- Buddhism in Germany

== Sources ==
- Bhikkhu Nyanatusita and Hellmuth Hecker, The Life of Nyanatiloka: The Biography of a Western Buddhist Pioneer Kandy, 2009.
- Buddhist Annual of Ceylon (1929). "The 'Island Hermitage' (Polgasduwa Tapas-arama)" in "The Buddhist Annual of Ceylon" (vol. 3, no. 3), p. 189. Retrieved 19 Dec 2008 from "MettaNet" at http://www.metta.lk/temples/ih/1929.htm.
- Bullitt, John T. (2008). "Nyanatiloka Mahathera" in Contributing Authors and Translators: Biographical Notes. Retrieved 19 Dec 2008 from "Access to Insight" at http://www.accesstoinsight.org/lib/authors/index.html#nyanatiloka.
- Harris, Elizabeth J. Harris (1998/2007). Ānanda Metteyya: The First British Emissary of Buddhism (Wheel Nos. 420/422). Kandy: Buddhist Publication Society. Retrieved 20 Dec 2008 from "BPS" at http://www.bps.lk/wheels_library/wh_420_422.html.
- Pariyatti (2008). The Chaṭṭha Saṅgayana (1954–1956). Retrieved 19 Dec 2008 from "Pariyatti" at http://www.pariyatti.org/ResourcesProjects/Treasures/ChatthaSangayana/tabid/78/Default.aspx.
- Perera, Janaka (28 May 2007). "Pioneering Western Buddhist monks forgotten" at "The Buddhist Channel." Retrieved 19 Dec 2008 from "Buddhist Channel" at http://www.buddhistchannel.tv/index.php?id=43,4202,0,0,1,0.
