= Buddhist Publication Society =

Charity aiming to spread the teachings of Buddha

The Buddhist Publication Society (BPS) is a publishing house with charitable status, whose objective is to disseminate the teachings of Gautama Buddha. It was founded in Kandy, Sri Lanka, in 1958 by two Sri Lankan lay Buddhists, A.S. Karunaratna and Richard Abeyasekera, and a European-born Buddhist monk, Nyanaponika Thera. Originally conceived as a limited effort to publish small, affordable books on fundamental Buddhist topics, the Society expanded in scope in response to the reception of their early publishing efforts. The Buddhist Publication Society's publications reflect the perspective of the Theravada denomination of Buddhism, drawing heavily from the Pāli Canon for source material.

The BPS supplies Buddhist literature to over 3,000 subscriber members in 80 countries. Its titles have been translated into many languages, including German, French, Spanish, Portuguese, Czech, Hindi, and Chinese.

== Publications ==
The Buddhist Publication Society publishes a variety of works, in both English and Sinhala, ranging from introductory works to translations of technical philosophical texts. The Society publishes works by a number of noted Theravada monks and lay writers, including books by Nyanaponika Thera, Nyanatiloka Mahathera, Bhikkhu Bodhi, Piyadassi Thera, Soma Thera, Bhikkhu Ñanamoli, Nyanananda Thera, Narada Mahathera, Webu Sayadaw, Ledi Sayadaw, Mahasi Sayadaw, Sayadaw U Pandita, Ajahn Chah, Hammalawa Saddhatissa, Acharya Buddharakkhita, Buddhadasa Bhikkhu, Ayya Khema, Sīlācāra, Paul Dahlke, I. B. Horner, K.N. Jayatilleke, Y. Karunadasa, Helmuth Hecker, S. Dhammika and Francis Story.

The BPS's English-language publications fall into three classes: two series of booklets called The Wheel and Bodhi Leaves, and full-size books.

The Wheel comprises booklets presented in a 4.8 x 7.2-inch size, usually containing 40 to 80 pages. Since the founding of BPS in 1958, around 250 titles have been published, although not all of them are currently in print. The booklets cover a wide range of topics, including specific Buddhist teachings (such as the Four Noble Truths), meditation and mind training, Buddhist history and culture, translations from the Pali Canon, and non-canonical Buddhist literature. All Wheel Publications have undergone digitization and are currently being reissued in bound volumes. Additionally, they are accessible on the BPS website.

Bodhi Leaves comprises compact booklets, roughly hand-sized, with a length ranging from 16 to 40 pages. Its categories mirror those of the Wheel, yet the style leans more towards conversation than exposition. Although the series has been discontinued, its issues are now accessible in digital format on the BPS website.

The BPS's line of full-size books includes both basic introductions and advanced texts on Buddhist doctrine and practice. Bhikkhu Ñanamoli's The Life of the Buddha is the most popular title. The BPS also publishes translations of several small classics from the Pali Canon, including Achariya Buddharakkhita's The Dhammapada and The Udāna and the Itivuttaka, translated by John Ireland.

Over the years BPS has published several works by the Burmese scholar-monk Ledi Sayadaw. The Manual of the Supreme Man (Uttamapurisa Dipani) and the Manual of Light and the Path of Higher Knowledge (Alin Kyan and Vijjamagga Dipani) were published in book form.

In the late 1990s, the BPS entered into co-publication agreements with Wisdom Publications in Boston to make its works more readily available to readers in the Americas and Europe. The BPS also co-publishes works on Theravada Buddhism first issued by Western publishers to make them more easily available for Asian readers.

BPS has also partnered with Pariyatti, a U.S. publisher and bookseller affiliated with the Vipassana Research Academy. As well as distributing BPS books in the Americas, Pariyatti has created an imprint called BPS Pariyatti Editions (BPE) to publish American editions of The Path of Purification, A Comprehensive Manual of Abhidhamma, The Noble Eightfold Path and other popular BPS titles.

Starting in 1960, the BPS has released a Sinhala-language version of The Wheel known as Damsak (= Dhamma-cakka) and a set of larger books in Sinhala titled Kalana Mithuru (= Kalyanamitra) Books. Starting in 1960, Damsak was edited by the Sri Lankan missionary monk Piyadassi Thera. After his death in 1998, responsibility for the Sinhala publications was assumed by his assistant, A.G.S. Kariyawasam, until his death in 2005, succeeded by Mr. Senadheera.

== Dhamma Dana Project ==
In 1993, the Society launched the Nyanaponika Dhamma Dana Project, named in honor of former Society president Nyanaponika Mahathera. Through this project, 50–150 copies of each new book published by the society are sent free of charge to libraries, monasteries, and Buddhist centers around the world. Copies of The Wheel are also sent to Buddhist temples and practice centers to be distributed free of charge.

== Staff ==
=== Presidents ===
- Nyanaponika Thera, 1958–1988
- Bhikkhu Bodhi, 1988–2010
- P.D. Premasiri, 2011–present

=== Editors ===
- Nyanaponika Thera, 1958–1984
- Bhikkhu Bodhi, 1984–2002
- Bhikkhu Nyanatusita 2005–present

== See also ==
- Pali Canon
- Pali literature
- Pali Text Society
- Dhamma Society Fund
- Pariyatti (bookstore)
- Buddhist Cultural Centre
- Path Press
- The Buddhist (TV channel)
- Shraddha TV
- Global Buddhist Network
- Lord Buddha TV
- Access to Insight
