= Sīlācāra =

Sīlācāra Bhikkhu
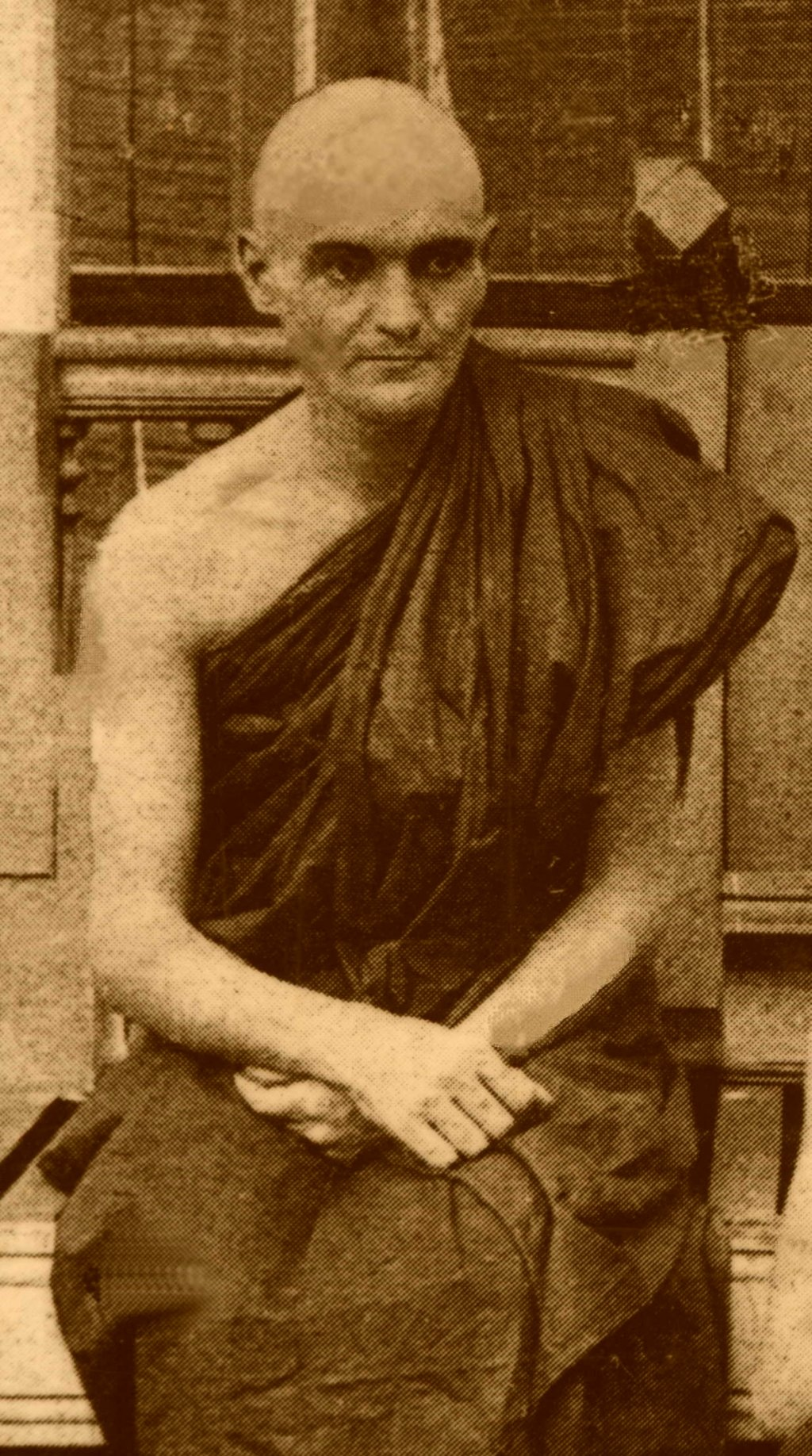
- Silacara, Rangoon, 1907
- Title: Bhikkhu

Personal life
- Born: John Frederick S. McKechnie; 22 October 1871 Hull, Yorkshire, England
- Died: 27 January 1951 (aged 79) Chichester, West Sussex, England
- Occupation: monk; translator; writer

Religious life
- Religion: Theravada
- Dharma name: Sīlācāra Bhikkhu

Senior posting
- Based in: Burma

Sīlācāra Bhikkhu (22 October 1871 – 27 January 1951), born and died as John Frederick S. McKechnie. He became a Buddhist monk in 1906 and was one of the earliest westerners in modern times to do so.

== Life ==
There are two main sources about Sīlācāra's life. The first is the biography in a Sri Lankan edition of A Young People's Life of the Buddha, by an anonymous author, whose information about McKechnie's early life needs verification; the second is the autobiography of Nyanatiloka Thera, who mentions him several times.

According to the biography, McKechnie's father was the baritone singer Sir Charles Santley and his mother was Caroline Mavis, however, Charles Santley's two wives were called Gertrude Kemble and Elizabeth Mary Rose-Innes, and being a child of Charles Santley would have given him the surname Santley not McKechnie. So, unless he was an extramarital child, this information is incorrect.

According to the same biography, he worked as apprentice stock-cutter in a clothing factory until the age of 21, then he emigrated to America to work for four years on a fruit and dairy farm. Whilst back in Glasgow, he had read about Buddhism in a copy of the magazine Buddhism: An Illustrated Review, which he had found in the public library, and answered the advertisement of the magazine's editor Bhikkhu Ānanda Metteyya (Charles Henry Allan Bennett) who asked for an editorial assistant in Rangoon. After going to Burma, he first taught for a year in the Buddhist boys' school of Mme Hlā Oung, a rich Burmese Buddhist philanthropist. It seems unlikely, however, that McKechnie, having been an apprentice in a clothes factory and a farm worker, was accepted as an editorial assistant for a magazine, taught at a school, and, after having become a Buddhist monk, translated and wrote books on Buddhism. So this information about his earlier employment might also be incorrect, and it seems more probable that he had received some kind of higher education during which he learnt German. The Buddhist Boy school owned by Commissioner U Hla Aung and his wife Daw Mya May, and an English art teacher called Ward teaching there, is mentioned in other sources.

In 1906 Nyanatiloka (Ñāṇatiloka) accepted McKechnie as novice (samanera) with the name Sāsanavaṃsa. He then stayed with Nyanatiloka and Ānanda Metteya at Kyundaw Kyaung, Kemmendine, Rangoon—a monastic residence in a quiet area that Mrs Hlā Oung had built for Ānanda Metteya and Nyanatiloka.

In 1906 or 1907, he was admitted as bhikkhu into the Sangha by the Sayadaw U Kumāra, who had also ordained Nyanatiloka, and was given the new name Sīlācāra. While a novice, he translated Bhikkhu Ñāṇatiloka’s The Word of the Buddha, from German into English. It was published in Rangoon in 1907.

In 1910 Sīlācāra intended to come to the Buddhist monastery Nyanatiloka planned to found near Novaggio, Lugano, Switzerland.

In 1914 he stayed in Tumlong, Sikkim, near the Tibetan border. Alexandra David-Néel was also staying there when Nyanatiloka visited Tumlong. One report states that Sīlācāra was in Sikkim on the invitation of the Maharaja to teach Buddhism. A picture of Sīlācāra sitting on a yak, next to Sidkeong Tulku (the future Maharaja of Sikkim) and Alexandra David-Néel can be seen on the website of the Alexandra David-Néel Cultural Centre.

During World War I he probably stayed in Burma, as Nyanatiloka wrote a letter to him there in 1917.

When Sīlācāra's health broke down due to asthma complicated with heart trouble, he disrobed on the advice of the German Buddhist Dr. Paul Dahlke and returned to England late in 1925. He assisted Anagarika Dharmapala at the Mahabodhi Society's British branch, lecturing and editing the British Buddhist. Due to health problems, he left London in 1932 for Wisborough Green, West Sussex to share the house ('The Kiln Bungalow') of Esther Lydia Shiel (née Furley) (1872-1942), the estranged wife of author M.P. Shiel and formerly the wife of William Arthur Jewson (1856-1914) (famous violinist and conductor). During this period, Sīlācāra was known simply as 'Fra'. He continued to write for Buddhist magazines in the UK, Sri Lanka, Burma, Germany, etc. Upon Esther Lydia's death (16 February 1942) her house in Wisborough Green was sold, and Sīlācāra entered an old persons' home (Bury House) at Bury, West Sussex, where he stayed until his death in 1951.

== Work ==
Sīlācāra was a prolific writer and translator, especially as a Buddhist monk, and his books and essays were reprinted in different editions. His articles were published in the Buddhism: An Illustrated Quarterly Review, The British Buddhist, Buddhist Annual of Ceylon, Maha-Bodhi, United Buddhist World, etc. He also translated from German works by Paul Dahlke and Nyanatiloka. At least one of his works was translated into German.

In his writings, Sīlācāra stresses the rational and scientific aspects of Buddhism.

== Writings ==
- ‘Buddhism and Pessimism’, Buddhism, II, 1, Rangoon, October 1905, pp. 33–47.
- The Word of the Buddha. An outline of the ethic-philosophical system of Buddha in words of Pali Canon by Nyanatiloka. Translated from the German by Sāsanavaṃsa (= Sīlācāra). Rangoon: International Buddhist Society, 1907
- Lotus Blossoms, London: The Buddhist Society of Great Britain and Ireland, 1914. Third and Revised Edition, London: The Buddhist Society of Great Britain and Ireland, 1917? ((See p. 30 The Fruit of Homelessness 1917.) Adyar, Madras: Theosophical Publishing House, 1914, 1968. Mentioned as being read in 1907, Christmas Humphreys, Sixty years of Buddhism in England (1907-1967) p. 3, London: Buddhist Society, 1968. Middle Way, Volume 74, p. 102.)
- Panchasila: The Five Precepts, Adyar, Madras: Theosophical Publishing House, 1913. Mentioned as published as The Bhikkhu, Pancha Sila, The Five Precepts in Rangoon in 1911, in The Buddhist Review, Volumes 3-4, 1911, p. 79, Buddhist Society of Great Britain and Ireland, London. Published in 1911 as Panchasila: The Five Precepts and To Those Who Mourn by Bhikkhu Silacara and C.W. Leadbeater, Rangoon, 1911.
- The Four Noble Truths, Adyar, Madras: Theosophical Publishing House, 1922. Stated as already published by The Review of Reviews, Volume 48, 1913.
- Die funf Gelübde. Ein Vortrag über Buddhismus von Bhikkhu Silacara. Translation of Panchasila: The Five Precepts by Vangiso. Breslau: W. Markgraf, 1912.
- The First Fifty Discourses of Gotama the Buddha, Breslau-London: Walter Markgraf, 1912–13, Munich 1924, Delhi 2005
- Buddhism and Science, Author Paul Dahlke. Translation from the German by Bhikkhu Silacara. 1913
- The Dhammapada, or Way of Truth, London: The Buddhist Society of Great Britain and Ireland, 1915
- The Noble Eightfold Path, Colombo: The Bauddha Sahitya Sabha, 1955. Originally published in The Theosophist, Volume 37, p. 14f. Adyar, Madras: Theosophical Society, 1916.
- The Fruit of Homelessness: The Sāmaññaphala Sutta, London: Buddhist Society of Great Britain and Ireland, 1917.
- Dhaniya: A Pali Poem. Translated from the Sutta Nipata, in Buddhist Review Vol. II., No. 2, London: The Buddhist Society of Great Britain and Ireland, 1917
- A Young People's Life of the Buddha, Colombo: W.E. Bastian and Co, 1927. Reprinted, 1953, 1995.
- Kamma, Calcutta : Maha-Bodhi Society of India, 1950. Already mentioned in The Mahabodhi, Vol. 47, p.130, 1939.
- Buddhist View of Religion, Bauddha Sahitya Sabha, Colombo, 1946.
- Right Understanding, Kandy: Buddhist Publication Society, Sri Lanka, 1968, 1979. Reprinted from the Maha Bodhi, Oct.-Nov. 1967.
- An Actual Religion, Kandy: Buddhist Publication Society, Sri Lanka, 1971
- The Buddhist Essays, Kandy: Buddhist Publication Society, Sri Lanka, 1978
- Buddhism for the Beginner, Calcutta : Mahabodhi Society of India, 1952. Reprinted in The Path of Buddhism, Colombo 1955.

== Sources ==
- Anonymous, A Biography, in Bhikkhu Silacara, A Young People's Life of the Buddha, Colombo 1953.
- Bhikkhu Nyanatusita and Hellmuth Hecker, The Life of Nyanatiloka: The Biography of a Western Buddhist Pioneer Kandy, 2009.
