= Khenmo Drolma =

Buddhist abbot of the Vajra Dakini Nunnery

Khenmo Drolma is the Buddhist abbot of the Vajra Dakini Nunnery, the first Westerner installed as abbot of the Drikung Kagyu lineage of Buddhism. Khenmo Konchog Nyima Drolma has studied with the foremost spiritual teachers of our time including H.H. Dalai Lama, H.H. Drikung Kyabgon Chetsang Rinpoche (the head of the Drikung Kagyu Lineage) and Ani Pema Chodron. After her novice ordination by Drikung Kyabgon in 1997, she received training at Gampo Abbey guided by Ven. Pema Chödrön, and attended their shedra (philosophy College). She created the Gampopa statue for their stupa and altar. In 2002 she took full ordination as a Buddhist nun in Taiwan. In 2004 she was installed as a Khenmo (Abbot) in the Drikung lineage, becoming the first woman and first westerner in her lineage to officially hold this responsibility. She teaches the Dharma internationally. Her current responsibilities, in addition to Vajra Dakini Nunnery, include the Tibetan/Himalayan Nuns Leadership Program and she chairs the international committee for the Bhikshuni Shravasti Rains Retreat.

== Career ==
She holds an MFA from the University of Pennsylvania. She was a professor at the Maine College of Art from 1981 to 1995.

She teaches a full Buddhist curriculum at Vajra Dakini Nunnery and lectures at Buddhist centers internationally.

== Personal life ==
Drolma is the daughter of Catherine Lahey Kelley. She is also a cancer survivor.
