= Das Buddhistische Haus =

Buddhist temple complex in Germany

Coordinates: 52°38′09″N 13°18′10″E

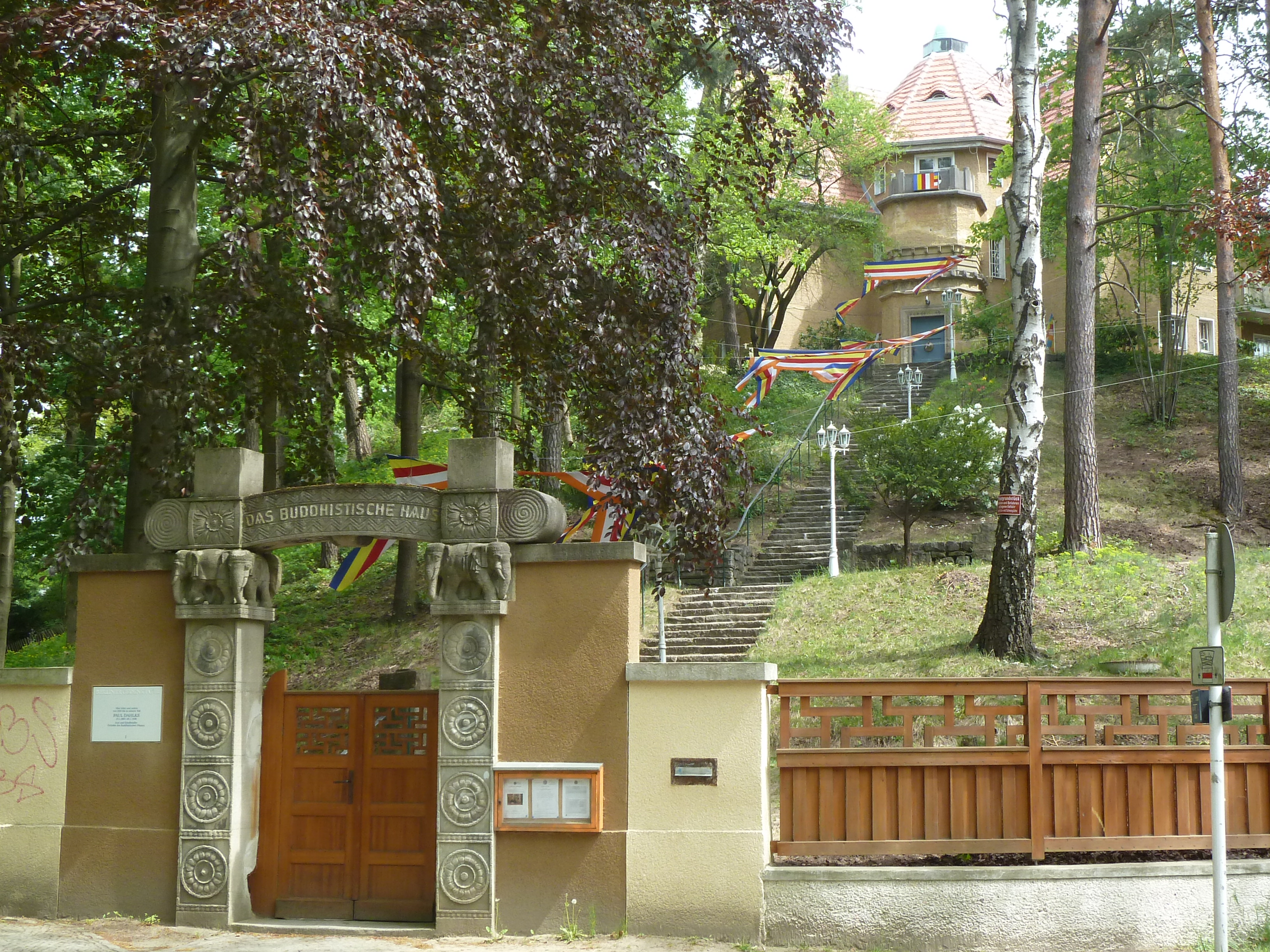
After the Elephant Gate 73 steps lead to the temple. Vesak festival flags can also be seen.

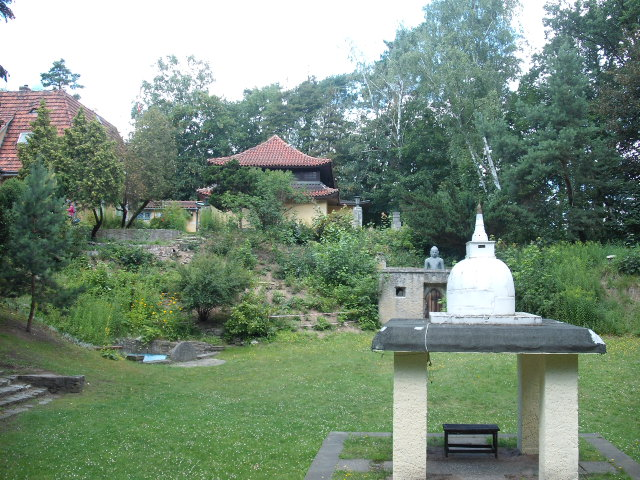
The garden and view of one of the buildings of the temple which is inspired by traditional Sri Lankan architecture

Das Buddhistische Haus (English: Berlin Buddhist Vihara, literally the Buddhist house) is a Theravada Buddhist temple complex (Vihara) in Frohnau, Berlin, Germany. It is considered to be the oldest and largest Theravada Buddhist center in Europe and has been declared a National Heritage site.

== History ==
The main building was designed by the architect Max Meyer for Paul Dahlke, a German physician who had undertaken a number of trips to Ceylon prior to World War I and became a Buddhist. It incorporates elements of Sri Lankan (Sinhalese) Buddhist architecture and culture and was completed in 1924. Under Dahlke's direction it became a center of Buddhism in Germany. After his death in 1928, the house was inherited by his relatives and Buddhists met in a house nearby. By 1941 Buddhist meetings and publications were prohibited by the Nazi government. After the war refugees lived in the quarters. The place deteriorated and was even considered for demolition, when Asoka Weeraratna, founder of the German Dharmaduta Society based in Sri Lanka, became aware of its existence. In December 1957 he bought the building from Dahlke’s nephew on behalf of the Trustees of the German Dharmaduta Society (GDS). As a result, the 'Haus' became the first Buddhist mission on German soil not operated by German but Sri Lankan Sinhalese Buddhist monks. It was renovated at that time as a Buddhist temple complex.

Missionary Buddhist (Dharmaduta) monks, primarily from Sri Lanka, came to stay at the Haus that became the center for spreading the teachings of the Buddha in Western Europe. The temple is open to the public and was visited by about 5,000 people in 2006.

== The temple complex ==
Entering the Elephant Door the visitor faces 73 steps up to reach the main building. The building houses among others the library and the meditation room. In a separate building, guests can be accommodated. In 1959, the city of Nagoya donated a sculpture of Guanyin that is placed in the garden.

== Dahlke’s inscription ==
Paul Dahlke created the inscription for Das Buddhistische Haus:

- What we are doing, anybody shall be able to see
- What we are saying, anybody shall be able to hear
- What we are thinking, anybody shall be able to know

== See also ==
- German Dharmaduta Society
- Buddhism in Germany
- Religion in Berlin
