= Asoka Weeraratna =

Sri Lankan Buddhist missionary (1918-1999)

Asoka Weeraratna අසෝක වීරරතන
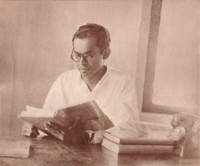
- Asoka Weeraratna
- Born: 12 December 1918; Galle, Sri Lanka
- Died: 2 July 1999 (aged 80); Mitirigala, Sri Lanka
- Other names: Alfred Weeraratna; Mitirigala Dhammanisanthi Thera
- Education: Mahinda College, Galle
- Known for: Propagation of Buddhism

Asoka Weeraratna (December 12, 1918 – July 2, 1999) was a Sri Lankan (Sinhala) Buddhist missionary, who founded the German Dharmaduta Society in 1952. He is also the founder of the Berlin Buddhist Vihara, one of the oldest Buddhist temples in Europe and Mitirigala Nissarana Vanaya, a famous meditation monastery in the Western Province, Sri Lanka. Asoka Weeraratna later entered the Order of Buddhist monks in 1972 as Ven. Mitirigala Dhammanisanthi Thera and spent his later life as a forest monk at the Mitirigala Nissarana Vanaya for a period of 27 years.
