= Paul Dahlke (Buddhist) =

German physician

Paul Dahlke (25 January 1865, Osterode – 29 February 1928) was a German physician and one of the founders of Buddhism in Germany. He wrote extensively about Buddhist teaching and living and translated Buddhist literature into German. In 1924 he established “Das Buddhistische Haus” considered to be the first Buddhist temple in Europe.

== Biography ==
Dahlke was born in Osterode in the Province of Prussia as the son of a civil servant. He completed the Gymnasium in 1883 and proceeded to study medicine in Berlin. He received his MD degree in August 1887 and soon took over a homeopathic medical office.

In 1898, he started a journey around the world and was fascinated by the South Pacific. He also stopped over in Ceylon where he encountered Buddhism. He had read about Buddhism when he had studied Schopenhauer. Two years later he went on his second journey, this time specifically to Ceylon to learn more about Buddhism. He learned Pali and met local Sinhala Buddhist monks among them Hikkaduwe Sumangala, Suriyagoda Sumangala, Nyananissara and Wagiswara. He returned a Buddhist and in the following years made several more journeys to Asia, primarily to Ceylon, but also to China, India, Burma, Thailand, and Indonesia. When World War I started he happened to be in Germany and was unable to travel to Ceylon as he had planned. After the war Dahlke bought property in Berlin Frohnau and asked the architect Max Meyer to build ‘Das Buddhistische Haus’ using elements of Sinhala Buddhist architecture. After he was able to move into the house in 1924 his activities included daily Buddhist meetings as well as presentations and publications. He died in 1928 and was buried on the property.

Das Buddhistische Haus was later purchased by Asoka Weeraratna on behalf of the Trustees of the German Dharmaduta Society in 1957 and converted into a Buddhist Vihara by stationing Buddhist monks from Sri Lanka on a permanent footing.

Das Buddhistische Haus (also called Berlin Vihara) thus became the first Theravada Buddhist Vihara in continental Europe.

== Publications ==
Dahlke founded two Buddhist magazines, the „Neubuddhistische Zeitschrift“ and the „Brockensammlung“. He published extensively in the medical literature and wrote about Buddhism.

=== Medical publications ===
- 1887 Über den Hitzschlag.
- 1914 Gesichtete Arzneimittellehre. (2. edition 1928)
- 1915/16 Klinischer Leitfaden der gesichteten Arzneimittellehre.
- 1916 Repertorium. (2. edition 1928)

=== Buddhist publications ===
- 1903 Aufsätze zum Verständnis des Buddhismus. 2 volumes (2. Auflage 1995)
- 1904 Buddhistische Erzählungen.
- 1905 Das Buch vom Genie.
- 1912 Buddhismus als Weltanschauung. (2. edition 1920)
- 1912 Die Bedeutung des Buddhismus für unsere Zeit. (2. edition 1924)
- 1913 Aus dem Reich des Buddha. Sieben Erzählungen. (2. edition 1924)
- 1913 Buddhism & Science.
- 1914 Buddhismus als Religion und Moral. (2. edition 1923)
- 1914 Englische Skizzen.
- 1918 Was ist der Buddhismus und was will er? (2. edition 1968)
- 1918 Über den Pali-Kanon.
- 1919 Staat und Kirche.
- 1920 Buddhismus und religiöser Wiederaufbau.
- 1920 Wie muß die neue Religion aussehen?
- 1921 Neu-Buddhistischer Katechismus.
- 1921 Das Buch Pubbenivasa.
- 1926 Der Buddhismus.
- 1928 Buddhismus als Wirklichkeitslehre und Lebensweg.
- 1928 Heilkunde und Weltanschauung.

==== Wheel Publications (BPS) ====
- Five Precepts: Collected Essays (WH055)
- Essays and Poems (WH077/078)

=== Translations (from Pali Scriptures) ===
- 1919 Dhammapadam. (3. edition 1969)
- 1920 Digha-Nikaya.
- 1920 Buddha. Auswahl aus dem Pali-Kanon. (5. edition 2000)
- 1923 Majjhima-Nikaya.
