= Alexandra David-Néel =

French explorer, spiritualist and writer (1868–1969)

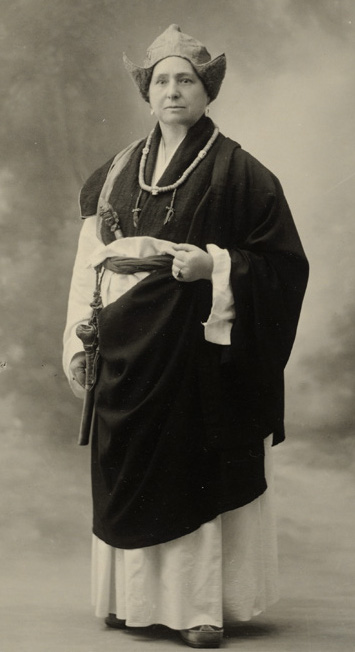
- Alexandra David-Néel in Calcutta, 1924
- Born: Louise Eugénie Alexandrine Marie David; 24 October 1868; Saint-Mandé, France
- Died: 8 September 1969 (aged 100); Digne, France
- Known for: Writing on Tibet
- Spouse: Philippe Néel de Saint-Sauveur (m. 1904; died 1941)

Alexandra David-Néel (born Louise Eugénie Alexandrine Marie David; 24 October 1868 – 8 September 1969) was a French explorer, spiritualist, Buddhist, anarchist, opera singer, and writer. (Note: "At the same time, she joined various secret societies – she would reach the thirtieth degree in the mixed Scottish Rite of Freemasonry – while feminist and anarchist groups greeted her with enthusiasm...In 1899, she wrote an anarchist treatise prefaced by the anarchist geographer Elisée Reclus. Frightened publishers refused, however, to publish this book written by a woman so proud she could not accept any abuses by the State, army, Church or high finance.") (Note: "Mystic, anarchist, occultist and traveller, Louise Eugenie Alexandrine Marie David was born in Paris on the 24th of October 1868...In 1899, Alexandra composed an anarchist treatise with a preface by the French geographer and anarchist Elisée Reclus (1820–1905). Publishers were, however, too terrified to publish the book, though her friend Jean Haustont printed copies himself and it was eventually translated into five languages.") (Note: "ALEXANDRA DAVID-NEEL, Daily Bleed Saint 2001–2008 First woman explorer of Tibet and its mysteries. Successively & simultaneously anarchist, singer, feminist, explorer, writer, lecturer, photographer, buddhist, architect, mail artist, sanskrit grammarian & Centenarian.") She is most known for her 1924 visit to Lhasa, Tibet, when it was forbidden to foreigners. David-Néel wrote over 30 books about Eastern religion, philosophy, and her travels, including Magic and Mystery in Tibet, which was published in 1929. Her teachings influenced the beat writers Jack Kerouac and Allen Ginsberg, the popularisers of Eastern philosophy Alan Watts and Ram Dass, and the esotericist Benjamin Creme.

== Biography ==
=== Early life and background ===
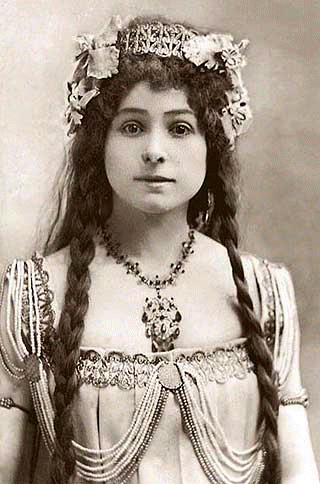
Alexandra David-Néel as a teenager, 1886

In 1871, when David-Néel was two years old, her father Louis David, appalled by the execution of the last Communards, took her to see the Communards' Wall at the Père-Lachaise cemetery in Paris; she never forgot this early encounter with the face of death, from which she first learned of the ferocity of humans. Two years later, the Davids emigrated to Belgium.

Since before the age of 15, she had been exercising austerities such as fasting and corporal torments drawn from biographies of ascetic saints found in the library of one of her female relatives, to which she refers in Sous des nuées d'orage, published in 1940.

At the age of 15, spending her holidays with her parents at Ostend, she ran away and reached the port of Vlissingen in the Netherlands to try and embark for England. Lack of money forced her to give up.

At the age of 18, David-Néel had already visited England, Switzerland and Spain on her own, and she was studying in Madame Blavatsky's Theosophical Society. "She joined various secret societies – she would reach the thirtieth degree in the mixed Scottish Rite of Freemasonry – while feminist and anarchist groups greeted her with enthusiasm... Throughout her childhood and adolescence, she was associated with the French geographer and anarchist Elisée Reclus (1820–1905). This led her to become interested in the anarchistic ideas of the time and in feminism, that inspired her to publish Pour la vie (For Life) in 1898. In 1899, she composed an anarchist treatise with a preface by Reclus. Publishers did not dare to publish the book, though her friend Jean Haustont printed copies himself and it was eventually translated into five languages." In 1891, she visited India for the first time, and met her spiritual preceptor, Swami Bhaskarananda Saraswati of Varanasi.

According to Raymond Brodeur, she converted to Buddhism in 1889, which she noted in her diary that was published under the title La Lampe de sagesse (The Lamp of Wisdom) in 1896. She was 21 years old. That same year, to refine her English, an indispensable language for an orientalist's career, she went to London where she frequented the library of the British Museum, and met several members of the Theosophical Society. The following year, back in Paris, she introduced herself to Sanskrit and Tibetan and followed different instructions at the Collège de France and at the Ecole pratique des hautes Etudes (practical school of advanced studies) without ever passing an exam there. According to Jean Chalon, her vocation to be an orientalist and Buddhist originated at the Guimet Museum.

=== 1895–1904: Opera singer ===
At the suggestion of her father, David-Néel attended the Conservatoire royal de Bruxelles (Royal Conservatory of Brussels), where she studied piano and singing. To help her parents who were experiencing setbacks, David-Néel, who had obtained a first prize for singing, took the position of first singer at the Hanoi Opera House (Indochina) during the seasons 1895–1896 and 1896–1897 under the name Alexandra Myrial. (Note: "At last, in the autumn of 1895, Alexandra landed a ... 31 She spent the next two years touring French Indochina, now Vietnam, appearing in Hanoi, Haiphong, and elsewhere, while performing lead roles in such operas as La traviata and Carmen")

She interpreted the role of the Violetta in La traviata (by Giuseppe Verdi), then she sang in Les Noces de Jeannette (by Victor Massé), in Faust and in Mireille (by Charles Gounod), Lakmé (by Léo Delibes), Carmen (by Georges Bizet), and Thaïs (by Jules Massenet). She maintained a pen friendship with Frédéric Mistral and Massenet at that time.

From 1897 to 1900, she was living together with the guitarist Jean Haustont in Paris, writing Lidia with him, a lyric tragedy in one act, for which Haustont composed the music and David-Néel the libretto. She left to sing at the opera of Athens from November 1899 to January 1900. Then, in July of the same year, she went to the opera of Tunis. Soon after her arrival in the city, she met a distant cousin, Philippe Néel, chief engineer of the Tunisian railways and her future husband. During a stay of Jean Haustont in Tunis in the summer of 1902, she gave up her singing career and assumed artistic direction of the casino of Tunis for a few months, while continuing her intellectual work.

=== 1904–1911: Marriage ===
On 4 August 1904, at age 36, she married Philippe Néel de Saint-Sauveur, whose lover she had been since 15 September 1900. Their life together was sometimes turbulent but characterized by mutual respect. It was interrupted by her departure, alone, for her third trip to India (1911–1925) (the second one was carried out for a singing tour) on 9 August 1911. She did not want children, aware that motherhood was incompatible with her need of independence and her inclination to education. She promised to return to Philippe in nineteen months, but it was fourteen years later, in May 1925, when they met again, separating after some days. David-Néel had come back with her exploration partner, the young Lama Aphur Yongden, whom she would make her adopted son in 1929. Legend has it that her husband was also her patron. The truth is probably quite different. She had, at her marriage, her own personal fortune.

During that time, she wrote for journals and lectured about controversial subjects in the cities of Europe. She advocated in favour of Buddhism and radical feminism. Her marriage started to unravel, as her travels kept her apart from her husband.

=== 1911–1925: The Indo-Tibetan expedition ===
Alexandra David-Néel's portrait from her book My Journey to Lhasa

==== Arrival in Sikkim (1912) ====
Alexandra David-Néel traveled for the second time to India to further her study of Buddhism. In 1912, she arrived at the royal monastery of Sikkim, where she befriended Maharaj Kumar (crown prince) Sidkeong Tulku Namgyal, the eldest son of the sovereign (Chogyal) of this kingdom (which would become a state of India), and traveled in many Buddhist monasteries to improve her knowledge of Buddhism. In 1914, she met young Aphur Yongden in one of these monasteries, 15 years old, whom she would later adopt as her son. Both decided to retire in a hermitage cavern at more than 4,000 meters (13,000 ft) above sea level in northern Sikkim.

Sidkeong, then the spiritual leader of Sikkim, was sent to the meeting with Alexandra David-Néel by his father, the Maharaja of Sikkim, having been told about her arrival in April 1912 by the British resident at Gangtok. On the occasion of this first encounter, their mutual understanding was immediate: Sidkeong, eager for reformation, was listening to Alexandra David-Néel's advice, and before returning to his occupations, he left behind the Lama Kazi Dawa Samdup as a guide, interpreter and professor of Tibetan. After that, Sidkeong confided in Alexandra David-Néel that his father wished for him to renounce the throne in favor of his half-brother.

==== Meeting with the 13th Dalai Lama in Kalimpong (1912) ====
Lama Kazi Dawa Samdup accompanied Alexandra David-Néel to Kalimpong, where she met with the 13th Dalai Lama in exile. She received an audience on 15 April 1912, and met Ekai Kawaguchi in his waiting room, whom she would meet again in Japan. The Dalai Lama welcomed her, accompanied by the inevitable interpreter, and he strongly advised her to learn Tibetan, an advice she followed. She received his blessing, then the Dalai Lama engaged the dialogue, asking her how she had become a Buddhist. David-Néel amused him by claiming to be the only Buddhist in Paris, and surprised him by telling him that the Gyatcher Rolpa, a sacred Tibetan book, had been translated by Phillippe-Édouard Foucaux, a professor at the Collège de France. She asked for many additional explanations that the Dalai Lama tried to provide, promising to answer all her questions in writing.

==== Stay at Lachen (1912–1916) ====
In late May, she went to Lachen, where she met Lachen Gomchen Rinpoche, the superior (gomchen) of the town's monastery, with the improvised interpreter M. Owen (E. H. Owen), a reverend who replaced the absent Kazi Dawa Samdup. In Lachen, she lived for several years close to one of the greatest gomchens of whom she had the privilege to be taught, and above all, she was very close to the Tibetan border, which she crossed twice against all odds.

In her anchorite cave, she practiced Tibetan yoga. She was sometimes in tsam, that is to retreat for several days without seeing anyone, and she learned the technique of tummo, which mobilized her internal energy to produce heat. As a result of this apprenticeship, her master, the Gomchen of Lachen, gave her the religious name of Yeshe Tome, "Lamp of Wisdom", which proved valuable to her because she was then known by Buddhist authorities everywhere she went in Asia.

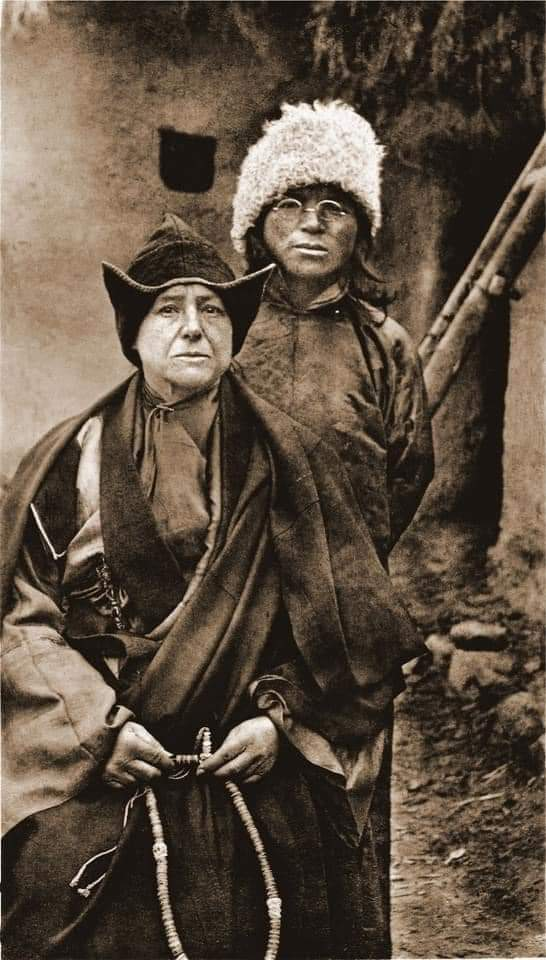
Alexandra David-Néel and the Lama Aphur Yongden in Tibet

While she was in company of Lachen Gomchen Rinpoche, Alexandra David-Néel encountered Sidkeong again on an inspection tour in Lachen on 29 May 1912. These three personalities of Buddhism, thus reunited, reflected and worked together to reform and expand Buddhism, as the Gomchen would declare. For David-Néel, Sidkeong organized a one-week expedition into the high areas of Sikkim, at 5,000 meters (16,000 ft) of altitude, which started on 1 July.

There was correspondence between Sidkeong and Alexandra David-Néel. In a letter by Sidkeong written at Gangtok on 8 October 1912, he thanked her for the meditation method she had sent him. On 9 October, he accompanied her to Darjeeling, where they visited a monastery together, while she prepared to return to Calcutta. In another letter, Sidkeong informed David-Néel that, in March 1913, he was able to enter Freemasonry at Calcutta, where he had been admitted as a member, provided with a letter of introduction by the governor of Bengal, a further link between them. He told her of his pleasure of having been allowed to become a member of this society.

When his father was about to die, Sidkeong called Alexandra David-Néel for help, and asked her for advice in bringing about the reform of Buddhism that he wished to implement at Sikkim once he came to power. Returning to Gangtok via Darjeeling and Siliguri, David-Néel was received like an official figure, with guard of honor, by Sidkeong on 3 December 1913.

On 4 January 1914, he gave her, as a gift for the new year, a lamani's (female lama) dress sanctified according to the Buddhist rites. David-Néel had her picture taken with a yellow hat completing the ensemble.

On 10 February 1914, the Maharaja died, and Sidkeong succeeded him. The campaign of religious reform could begin, Kali Koumar, a monk of southern Buddhism was called to participate in it, as well as Sīlācāra (an Englishman) who was then living in Burma. Ma Lat (Hteiktin Ma Lat) came from that same country, David-Néel was in correspondence with her, and Sidkeong married Ma Lat, with Alexandra David-Néel becoming the Maharaja's marriage counselor.

While she was at the monastery of Phodong, the abbot of which was Sidkeong, David-Néel declared she heard a voice announcing to her that the reforms would fail.

On 11 November 1914, leaving the cavern of Sikkim where she had gone to meet the gomchen, David-Néel was received at Lachen Monastery by Sidkeong. One month later, she learned about Sidkeong's sudden death, news that affected her and made her think of poisoning.

==== First trip to Tibet and meeting with the Panchen Lama (1916) ====
On 13 July 1916, without asking for permission, Alexandra David-Néel left for Tibet, accompanied by Yongden and a monk. She planned to visit two great religious centers close to her Sikkim retreat: the monastery of Chorten Nyima and Tashilhunpo Monastery, close to Shigatse, one of the biggest cities of southern Tibet. At the monastery of Tashilhunpo, where she arrived on 16 July, she was allowed to consult the Buddhist scriptures and visit various temples. On the 19th, she met with the Panchen Lama, by whom she received blessings and a charming welcome: he introduced her to his entourage's persons of rank, to his professors, and to his mother (with whom David-Néel tied bonds of friendship and who suggested to her to reside in a convent). The Panchen Lama bade and proposed her to stay at Shigatse as his guest, which she declined, leaving the town on 26 July, not without having received the honorary titles of a Lama and a doctor in Tibetan Buddhism and having experienced hours of great bliss. (Note: "In 1916 she again went into Tibet, this time at the invitation of the Panchen Lama [...]. He gave her access to Tashilhunpo's immense libraries of Buddhists scriptures and made every corner of the various temples accessible to her. She was lavishly entertained by both the Panchen Lama and his mother, with whom she remained a longtime friend. 'The special psychic atmosphere of the place enchanted me,' she later wrote. 'I have seldom enjoyed such blissful hours.'")

Upon her return to Sikkim, the British colonial authorities, pushed by missionaries exasperated by the welcome afforded David-Néel by the Panchen Lama and annoyed by her having ignored their ban of entering Tibet, informed her that she was to be deported for violating the no-entry edict. (Note: "Alexandra David-Neel then returned to Sikkim with honorary lama's robes and the equivalent of a Doctor of Philosophy in Tibetan Buddhism. There she found herself slapped with a deportation notice by the British colonial authorities. They objected to her having ignored their no-entry edict in going across the border into Tibet.")

==== Trip to Japan, Korea, China, Mongolia, and Tibet ====
As it was impossible to return to Europe during World War I, Alexandra David-Néel and Yongden left Sikkim for India and then Japan. There she met the philosopher Ekai Kawaguchi who had managed to stay for eighteen months in Lhasa as a Chinese monk in disguise a few years earlier. David-Néel and Yongden subsequently left for Korea and then Beijing, China. From there, they chose to cross China from east to west, accompanied by a colourful Tibetan Lama. Their journey took several years through the Gobi, Mongolia, before a break of three years (1918–1921) at Kumbum Monastery in Tibet, where David-Néel, helped by Yongden, translated the famous Prajnaparamita.

David-Néel preferred to eat vegetarian food throughout her life but whilst traveling in Tibet would often eat meat dishes as a guest at monasteries.

==== Incognito stay in Lhasa (1924) ====
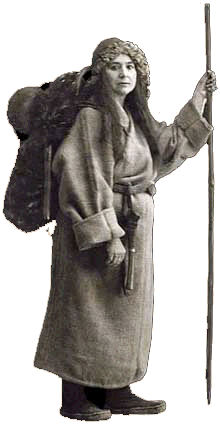
In Lhasa in 1924

Disguised as a beggar and a monk, respectively, and carrying a backpack as discreet as possible, Alexandra David-Néel and Yongden then left for the Forbidden City. In order not to betray her status as a foreigner, David-Néel did not dare to take a camera and survey equipment, she hid, however, under her rags a compass, a pistol, and a purse with money for a possible ransom. Finally, they reached Lhasa in 1924, merged with a crowd of pilgrims coming to celebrate the Monlam Prayer Festival. They stayed in Lhasa for two months visiting the holy city and the large surrounding monasteries: Drepung, Sera, Ganden, Samye, and met Swami Asuri Kapila (Cesar Della Rosa Bendio). Foster Stockwell pointed out that neither the Dalai Lama nor his assistants welcomed David-Néel, that she was neither shown the treasures of lamasery nor awarded a diploma. Jacques Brosse states more precisely that she knew the Dalai Lama well, but he didn't know that she was in Lhasa and she could not reveal her identity. She found "nothing very special" in Potala, of which she remarked that the interior design was "entirely Chinese-style". (Note: "Le palais du dalaï-lama dont la décoration intérieure, très riche en certains endroits, est entièrement de style chinois, n'a rien de très particulier.") Despite her face smeared with soot, her yak wool mats, and her traditional fur hat, she was finally unmasked (due to too much cleanliness – she went to wash herself every morning at the river) and denounced to Tsarong Shape, the Governor of Lhasa. By the time the latter took action, David-Néel and Yongden had already left Lhasa for Gyantse. They were told about the story only later, by letters of Ludlow and David Macdonald (the British sales representative in Gyantse). (Note: "Cependant, Alexandra commet à Lhasa même une imprudence qui faillit lui coûter cher, celle de se rendre chaque matin à la rivière pour faire un brin de toilette en cette période hivernale. Ce fait inhabituel intrigue une de ses voisines à un point tel qu'elle le signale au Tsarong Shapé (le gouverneur de Lhasa). Celui-ci, absorbé par des préoccupations plus importantes, allait, quelque temps plus tard, envoyer un de ses hommes pour procéder à une enquête lorsque la rumeur lui apprend qu'Alexandra et Yongden viennent d'arriver à Gyantsé. Le gouverneur en a aussitôt déduit que la dame se lavant tous les matins ne pouvait être qu'Alexandra. Cette histoire, Alexandra et Yongden ne l'ont connue que quelques mois après, par des lettres de messieurs Ludlow et David Macdonald, l'agent commercial britannique qui, à Gyantsé, a stoppé leur avance.")

In May 1924, the explorer, exhausted, "without money and in rags", was accommodated together with her companion at the Macdonald home for a fortnight. She managed to reach Northern India through Sikkim thanks partly to the 500 rupees she borrowed from Macdonald and to the necessary papers that he and his son-in-law, captain Perry, obtained for her. In Calcutta, dressed in the new Tibetan outfit Macdonald had bought for her, she got herself photographed in a studio. (Note: "La famille Macdonald prête des vêtements et achète une nouvelle tenue tibétaine à Alexandra. C'est dans cette robe neuve qu'elle se fera photographier en studio, quelques mois plus tard à Calcutta.")

After her return, starting at her arrival at Havre on 10 May 1925, she was able to assess the remarkable fame her audacity had earned her. She hit the headlines of the newspapers and her portrait spread in the magazines. The account of her adventure would become the subject of a book, My Journey to Lhasa, which was published in Paris, London and New York in 1927, but met with disbelief of critics who had a hard time accepting the stories about such practices as levitation and tummo (the increase of body temperature to withstand cold).

In 1972, Jeanne Denys, who was at one time working as a librarian for David-Néel, would publish Alexandra David-Néel au Tibet: une supercherie dévoilée (approximately: Alexandra David-Neel in Tibet: trickery uncovered), a book which caused something of a sensation by claiming to demonstrate that David-Néel had not entered Lhasa. Jeanne Denys maintained that the photograph of David-Néel and Aphur sitting in the area before the Potala, taken by Tibetan friends, was a montage. She pretended that David-Néel's parents were modest Jewish storekeepers who spoke Yiddish at home. She went as far as to accuse David-Néel of having invented the accounts of her voyages and of her studies. (Note: "The motives of this ill-tempered, anti-Semitic tract were made obvious by the author's insistence that Alexandra's parents had been modest shopkeepers and that they were Jewish and spoke yiddish at home" ... "Denys called her subject an actress and alleged that she was an impostor who invented the stories of her travel and studies.")

In 1975, Jeanne Denys's thesis was taken up and developed by Jean Marquès-Rivière in the Madrid-based journal Arbor of Consejo superior de Investigationes Cientificas. In a Spanish-language review of Jeanne Denys's book, he in turn states that Alexandra David-Néel never went to Tibet and that she lived in China from 1917 to 1924. Her role was allegedly to monitor Franco-Belgian interests exploiting the Beijing-Hanchen railway and the mines of Gansu. This review, translated into French by Bernard Dubant, was reprinted posthumously in 2003 in the journal Charis. Archives de l'unicorne.

=== 1925–1937: The European interlude ===
Back in France, Alexandra David-Néel rented a small house in the hills of Toulon and was looking for a home in the sun and without too many neighbors. A realtor from Marseille suggested a small house in Digne-les-Bains (Provence) to her in 1928. She, who was looking for the sun, visited the house during a rainstorm, but she liked the place and she bought it. Four years later, she began to enlarge the house, called Samten-Dzong or "fortress of meditation", the first hermitage and Lamaist shrine in France according to Raymond Brodeur. There she wrote several books describing her various trips. In 1929, she published her most famous and beloved work, Mystiques et Magiciens du Tibet (Magicians and Mystics in Tibet).

=== 1937–1946: Chinese journey and Tibetan retreat ===
In 1937, aged sixty-nine, Alexandra David-Néel decided to leave for China with Yongden via Brussels, Moscow and the Trans-Siberian Railway. Her aim was to study ancient Taoism. She found herself in the middle of the Second Sino-Japanese War and attended the horrors of war, famine and epidemics. Fleeing the combat, she wandered through China on a shoestring budget. The Chinese journey took course during one and a half years between Beijing, Mount Wutai, Hankou and Chengdu. On 4 June 1938, she went back to the Tibetan town of Tachienlu for a retreat of five years. She was deeply touched by the announcement of the death of her husband in 1941. (Note: "Alexandra ne part plus à la découverte d'une philosophie ou d'un monde inconnus. Voulant conserver et affermir la place qu'elle a durement acquise, elle se rend à Pékin pour élargir le champ de ses connaissances sur l'ancien "taoïsme". le séjour est envisagé pour plusieurs années, mais elle ignore encore combien. Les événements vont bouleverser le programme qu'elle avait établi et la précipiter sur les routes chinoises... / Le périple lui-même s'est déroulé sur une durée d'un an et demi, entrecoupé par des séjours prolongés à Pékin, au Wutai Shan, à Hankéou, et à Chengtu, avant de s'achever par cinq années de retraite forcée dans les marches tibétaines à Tatsienlou.")

One minor mystery relating to Alexandra David-Néel has a solution. In Forbidden Journey, p. 284, the authors wonder how Mme. David-Néel's secretary, Violet Sydney, made her way back to the West in 1939 after Sous des nuées d'orage (Storm Clouds) was completed in Tachienlu. Peter Goullart's Land of the Lamas (not in Forbidden Journey's bibliography), on pp. 110–113 gives an account of his accompanying Ms. Sydney partway back, then putting her under the care of Lolo bandits to continue the journey to Chengdu. While in Eastern Tibet David-Néel and Yongden completed circumambulation of the holy mountain Amnye Machen. In 1945, Alexandra David-Néel went back to India thanks to Christian Fouchet, French Consul at Calcutta, who became a friend; they stayed in touch until David-Néel's death. She finally left Asia with Aphur Yongden by airplane, departing from Calcutta in June 1946. On 1 July, they arrived at Paris, where they stayed until October, when they went back to Digne-les-Bains.

=== 1946–1969: the Lady of Digne ===
At 78, Alexandra David-Néel returned to France to arrange the estate of her husband, then she started writing from her home in Digne.

Between 1947 and 1950, Alexandra David-Néel came across Paul Adam – Venerable Aryadeva, she commended him because he took her place on short notice, at a conference held at the Theosophical Society in Paris.

In 1952, she published the Textes tibétains inédits ("unpublished Tibetan writings"), an anthology of Tibetan literature including, among other things, the erotic poems attributed to the 6th Dalai Lama. In 1953, a newspiece followed, Le vieux Tibet face à la Chine nouvelle, in which she gave "a certain and documented opinion" on the tense situation in the regions once visited by her.

Yongden died suddenly on 7 October 1955. According to Jacques Brosse, Yongden, seized by a strong fever and sickness, which David-Néel attributed to a simple indigestion, fell into a coma during the night and died carried off by kidney failure according to the doctor's diagnosis. Just having turned 87, David-Néel found herself alone. Yongden's ashes were kept safe in the Tibetan oratory of Samten Dzong, awaiting to be thrown into the Ganges, together with those of David-Néel after her death. With age, David-Néel suffered more and more from articular rheumatism that forced her to walk with crutches. "I walk on my arms", she used to say. Her work rhythm slowed down: she did not publish anything in 1955 and 1956, and, in 1957, only the third edition of the Initiations lamaïques.

In April 1957, she left Samten Dzong in order to live at Monaco with a friend who had typed her manuscripts. She decided to live alone in a hotel, going from one establishment to the next, until June 1959, when she was introduced to a young woman, Marie-Madeleine Peyronnet, who she took as her personal secretary. She would stay with the old lady until the end, "watching over her like a daughter over her mother – and sometimes like a mother over her unbearable child – but also like a disciple at the service of her guru", according to the words of Jacques Brosse.

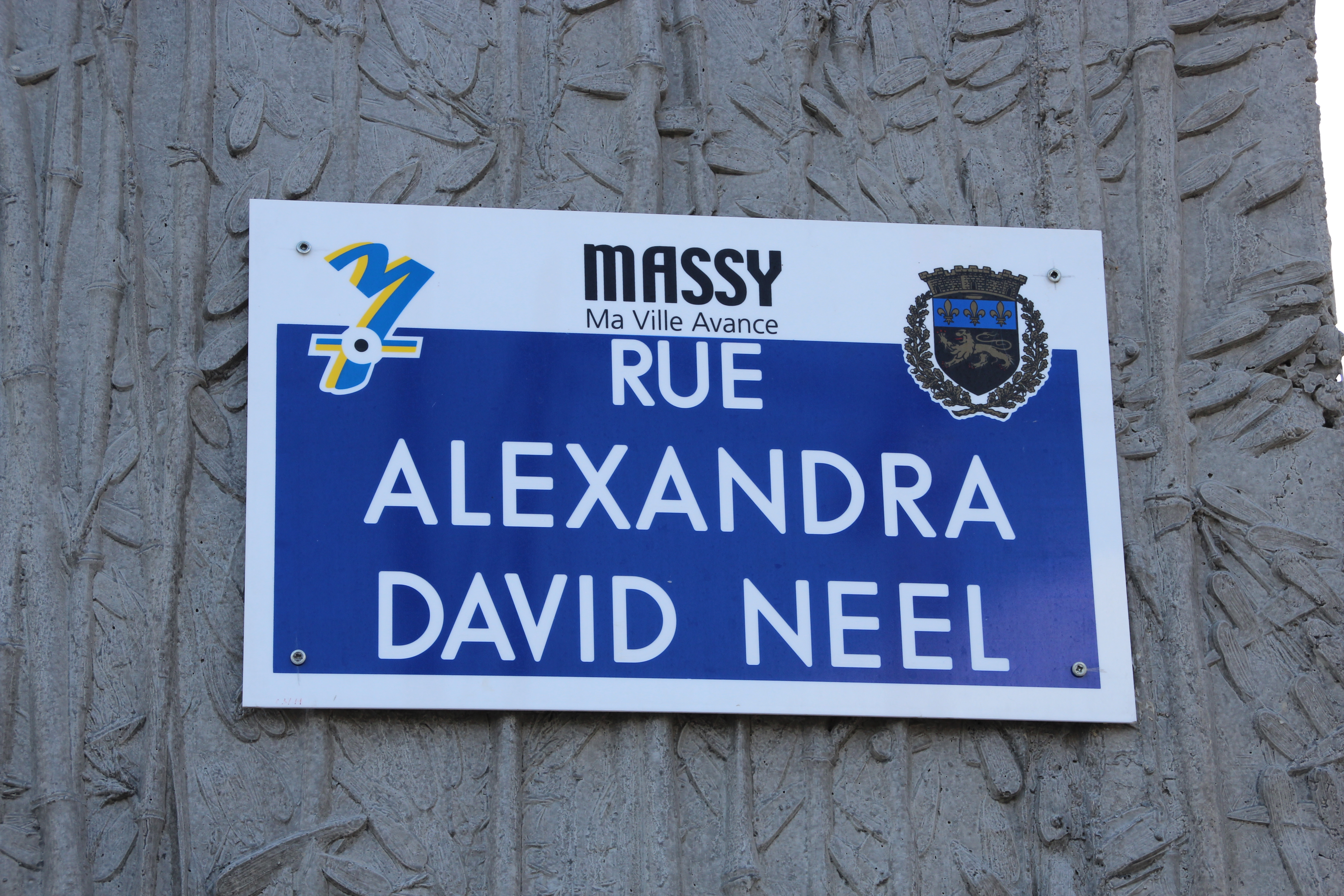
Road named Alexandra David-Néel in Massy, Essonne, suburb of Paris.

== Legacy ==
In 1925, she won the Award Monique Berlioux of the Académie des sports. Although she was not a sportswoman in a strict sense, she is part of the list of the 287 Gloires du sport français (English: Glories of French sport).

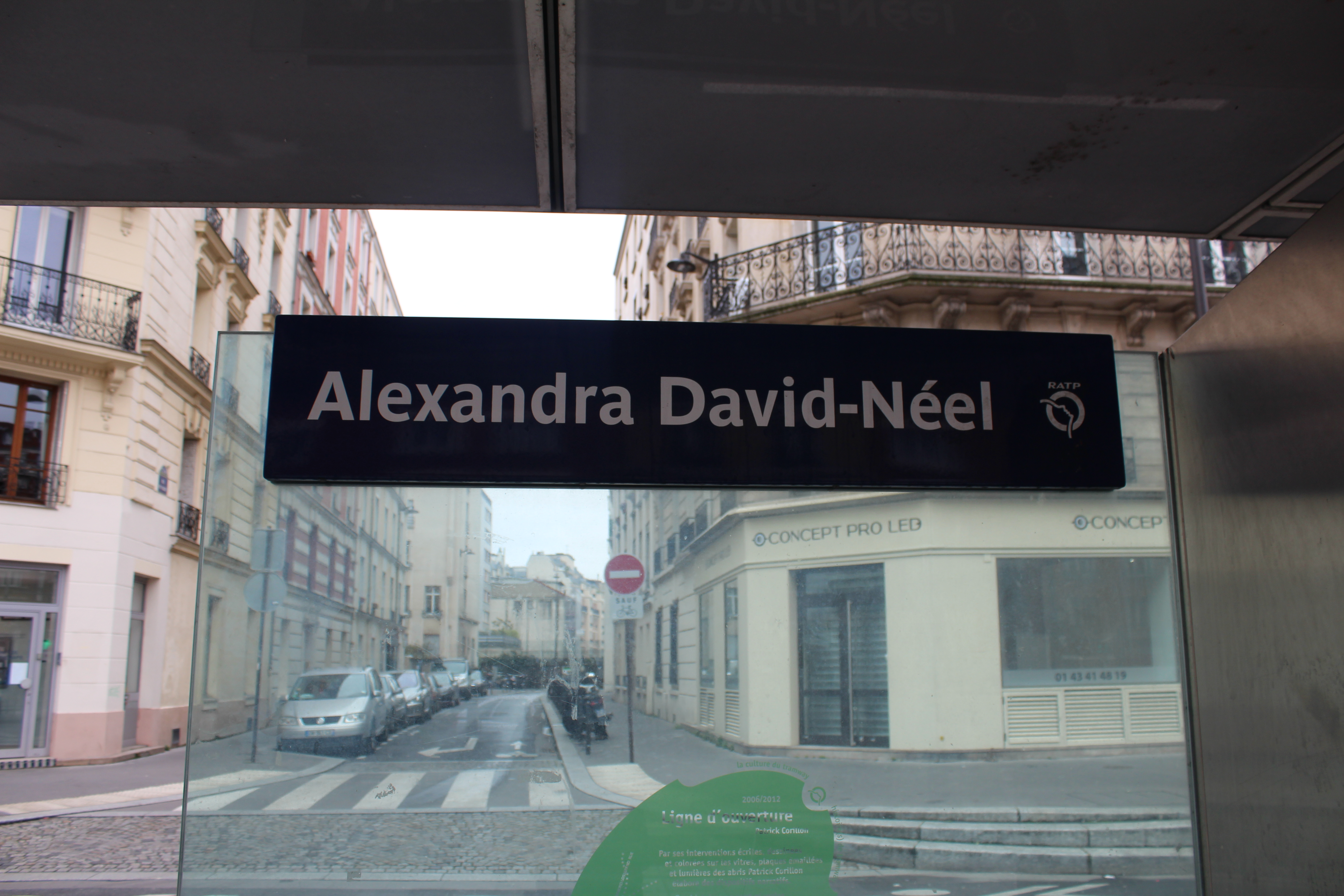
Alexandra David-Néel tram station on line 3a of the Île-de-France tramway

In 2006, Priscilla Telmon paid tribute to Alexandra David-Néel through an expedition on foot and alone across the Himalaya. She recounted her predecessor's journey from Vietnam to Calcutta via Lhasa. A movie, Au Tibet Interdit (English: Into Forbidden Tibet), was shot on that expedition.

== Bibliography ==
- 1898 Pour la vie
- 1911 Le modernisme bouddhiste et le bouddhisme du Bouddha
- 1927 Voyage d'une Parisienne à Lhassa (1927, My Journey to Lhasa, available on Wikisource)
- 1929 Mystiques et Magiciens du Tibet (1929, Magic and Mystery in Tibet; 1936, With Mystics and Magicians in Tibet)
- 1930 Initiations Lamaïques (Initiations and Initiates in Tibet)
- 1931 La vie Surhumaine de Guésar de Ling le Héros Thibétain (The Superhuman Life of Gesar of Ling)
- 1933 Grand Tibet; Au pays des brigands-gentilshommes
- 1935 Le lama au cinq sagesses
- 1938 Magie d'amour et magic noire; Scènes du Tibet inconnu (Tibetan Tale of Love and Magic)
- 1939 Buddhism: Its Doctrines and Its Methods
- 1940 Sous des nuées d'orage; Récit de voyage
- 1949 Au coeur des Himalayas; Le Népal
- 1951 Astagakra Gîtâ, Discours sur l'Advaita Vedanta, translation from Sanskrit into French
- 1951 Les Enseignements Secrets des Bouddhistes Tibétains (The Secret Oral Teachings in Tibetan Buddhist Sects)
- 1951 L'Inde hier, aujourd'hui, demain
- 1952 Textes tibétains inédits
- 1953 Le vieux Tibet face à la Chine nouvelle
- 1954 La puissance de néant, by Lama Yongden (The Power of Nothingness)
- Grammaire de la langue tibétaine parlée
- 1958 Avadhuta Gîtâ, poetic text based on the principles of Advaita Vedanta, translation from Sanskrit into French
- 1958 La connaissance transcendente
- 1961 Immortalité et réincarnation: Doctrines et pratiques en Chine, au Tibet, dans l'Inde
- L'Inde où j'ai vecu; Avant et après l'indépendance
- 1964 Quarante siècles d'expansion chinoise
- 1970 En Chine: L'amour universel et l'individualisme intégral: les maîtres Mo Tsé et Yang Tchou
- 1972 Le sortilège du mystère; Faits étranges et gens bizarres rencontrés au long de mes routes d'orient et d'occident
- 1975 Vivre au Tibet; Cuisine, traditions et images
- 1975 Journal de voyage; Lettres à son Mari, 11 août 1904 – 27 décembre 1917. Vol. 1. Ed. Marie-Madeleine Peyronnet
- 1976 Journal de voyage; Lettres à son Mari, 14 janvier 1918 – 31 décembre 1940. Vol. 2. Ed. Marie-Madeleine Peyronnet
- 1979 Le Tibet d'Alexandra David-Néel
- 1981 Secret Oral Teachings in Tibetan Buddhist Sects
- 1986 La lampe de sagesse

Many of Alexandra David-Neel's books were published more or less simultaneously both in French and English.

== See also ==
- Atlas, a 1991 opera loosely based on David-Néel's life and writings
- Elise Wortley
- Once Upon a Time... The Explorers
- Buddhism in France
- Tulpa - creations of mental powers, David-Néel claimed to have witnessed this in Tibet
