= Kazi Dawa Samdup =

Indian translator (1868–1922)

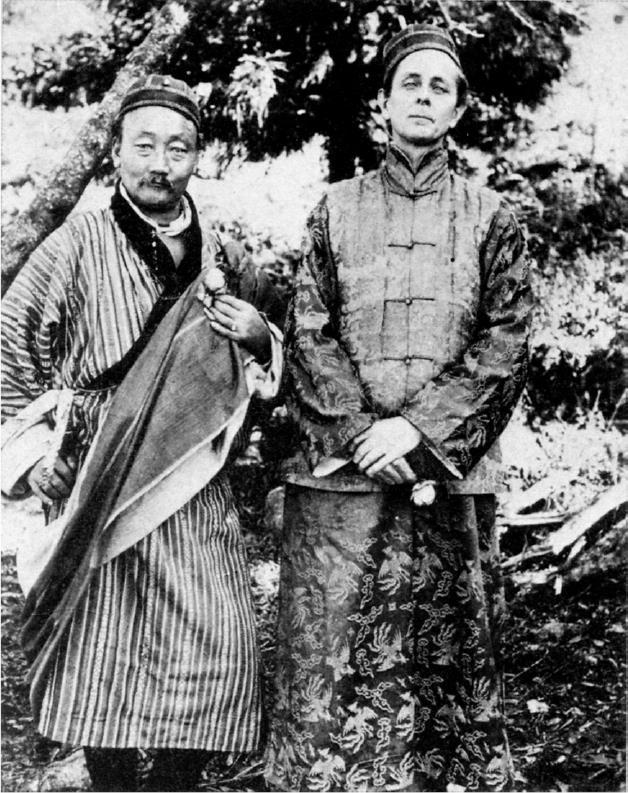
- Dawa Samdup and Walter Evans-Wentz photographed circa 1919.
- Born: 17 June 1868; Kingdom of Sikkim
- Died: 22 March 1922 (aged 53); Calcutta, Bengal, British India
- Education: Bhutia Boarding School, Darjeeling
- Known for: author, Translator teacher
- Notable work: A History of Sikkim, The Tibetan Book of the Dead, Tibet's Great Yogi Milarepa

Lama Kazi Dawa Samdup (17 June 1868 – 22 March 1922) is now best known as one of the first translators of important works of Tibetan Buddhism into the English language and a pioneer central to the transmission of Buddhism in the West. From 1910 he also played a significant role in relations between British India and Tibet.

== Biography ==
Kazi Dawa Samdup was born in Sikkim on 17 June 1868. His father was Shalngo Nyima Paljor of the Guru Tashi clan. On the death of his mother, his father remarried and had three more sons and two daughters from his second wife. Kazi Dawa Samdup's education began at the age of four learning the Tibetan script from his grandfather. In 1874 he joined the Bhutia Boarding School in Darjeeling where he impressed the headmaster Rai Bahadur Sarat Chandra Das. His Tibetan teacher was Ugyen Gyatso, a lama from the Pemayangtse monastery in West Sikkim.

After finishing school, he joined the service of British India as Chief Interpreter to the Commissioner of Raj Shahi Division and was posted to Buxaduar which was then part of Bhutan. During his stay in Bhutan, he became a pupil of a learned and ascetic lama, Lopen Tshampa Norbu (Slob dpon Mtshams pa Nor bu) d. 1916 of Punakha from whom he received initiation and instruction. Although he was interested in taking up a monastic life, at the request of his father, he married and later had two children, one son and a daughter.

When his father died he also became responsible for looking after his stepmother, and younger siblings. (Of the three younger half-brothers he took care of, the first would later become a lecturer of Calcutta University, the second would be the prime minister of the king, and the third, "Sikkim Mahinda", joined the Buddhist priesthood in Ceylon and was an important figure in the Sri Lankan independence movement, and a well-known Sinhala poet and author.)

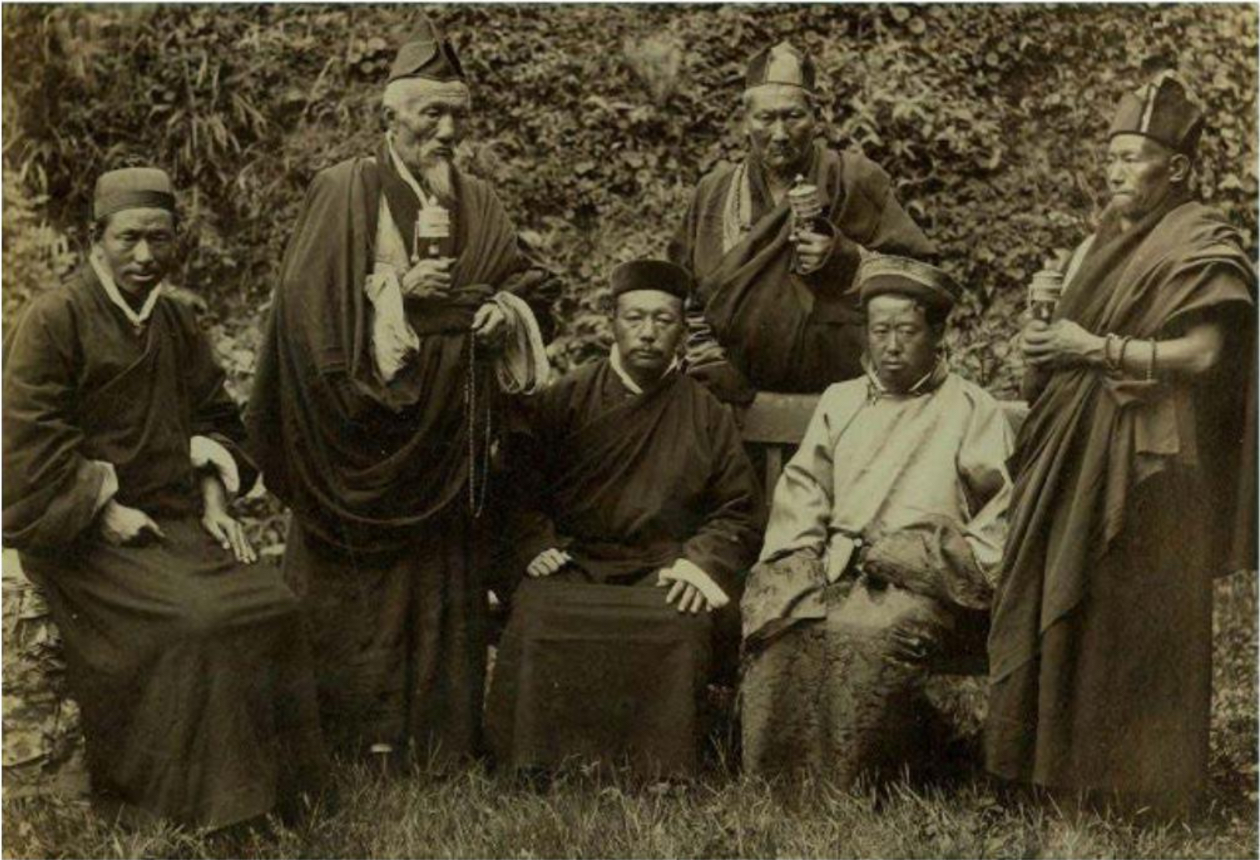
The Chogyal of Sikkim at Darjeeling, 1911.

At that time the Chogyal of Sikkim, Sir Thutob Namgyal, was looking for a headmaster, who could teach both Tibetan and English, for the state Bhutia Boarding School for boys at Gangtok and Kazi Dawa Samdup was proposed for this post by the Crown Prince Sidkeong Tulku. He also undertook the compilation and translation of the Sikkim Gazette for the Maharaja.

In 1905, he accompanied the Maharaja of Sikkim to Calcutta for the visit of the Prince and Princess of Wales.

In 1910, he acted as interptetor to Sir Charles Bell and the 13th Dalai Lama during the later's visit to India.

In 1911 he accompanied the Maharaja of Sikkim to Delhi for the coronation Durbar of King George V.

In 1912 Sidkeong Tulku Namgyal entrusted his "confidante and spiritual sister" Alexandra David-Néel to Kazi Dawa Samdup to be her a guide, interpreter and teacher of Tibetan. He accompanied her to Kalimpong where she went to meet the 13th Dalai Lama on 15 April 1912. At that time they also met, in the waiting room, Ekai Kawaguchi from Japan.

In 1914, he again acted as an interpreter and translator for Sir Charles Bell during the historic Simla Convention on the Indo-Tibet Border signed between India, Tibet and China.

In 1920, he was appointed teacher in Tibetan at the University of Calcutta.

Kazi Dawa Samdup died in Calcutta on 22 March 1922.

=== Work with W. Y. Evans-Wentz ===
Kazi Dawa Samdup is probably best known for his path-breaking translations of Tibetan texts which were later edited and published by W. Y. Evans-Wentz.

== Partial bibliography ==
- A Tibetan Funeral Prayer. Journal of the Asiatic Society of Bengal, n.s. vol. 12 (1916), pp. 147–159. – Includes Tibetan text.
- An English-Tibetan Dictionary: Containing a Vocabulary of Approximately Twenty Thousand Words with their Tibetan Equivalents. Calcutta, The Baptist Mission Press, 1919.
  — This dictionary is significant because it contains some Sikkimese and Dzongkha words as well as Tibetan.

With W.Y. Evans Wentz (editor):

- The Tibetan Book of the Dead
  — According to Matthew Kapstein, this is "without doubt the Tibetan work best known in the West and in the three-quarters of a century since its initial translation it has won a secure place for itself in the Religious Studies canon."
- Tibet's Great Yogi Milarepa
- Tibetan Yoga and Secret Doctrines

With Sir John Woodroffe:

- Shrîchakrasambhâra Tantra: A Buddhist Tantra (Dem-chog Tantra). First published in 1918–1919. The title is misleading since it is not in fact a translation of the Cakrasamvara Tantra – but is a translation of a Tibetan sadhana of Chakrasambhâra.

Unpublished Works:

== Sources ==
- Alexandra David Neel (2004). Magic And Mystery in Tibet, 1932. Kessinger Publishing. ISBN 978-1-4179-7754-3.
- Samdup, Dasho P. "A Brief Biography of Kazi Dawa Samdup" in Bulletin of Tibetology
- Lama Kazi Dawa Samdup – at Rangjung Yeshe Wiki
- Taylor, Kathleen . "Sir John Woodroffe, Tantra And Bengal: An Indian Soul In A European Body?". Routledge, 2001, ISBN 0-7007-1345-X.
- Cuevas, Bryan J. "Hidden History of the Tibetan Book of the Dead". Oxford University Press, 2005, ISBN 019530652X
