= Marie-Madeleine Peyronnet =

- Born: June 30, 1930; De Foucauld (in French Algeria), now called Rechaiga, Algeria
- Died: April 24, 2023 (aged 92); Digne-les-Bains, France
- Other names: La Tortue, nickname given to her by Alexandra David-Néel
- Occupation: Secretaty to A. David-Néel
- Years active: 1959–1969
- Awards: Ordre des Arts et des Lettres, Chevalier (Knight), (1996).

Marie-Madeleine Peyronnet, born on 30 June 1930 in De Foucauld (French Algeria, now Rechaiga, Algeria, and died on 24 April 2023 in Digne-les-Bains, was personal secretary to explorer Alexandra David-Néel from 1959 to 1969. Nicknamed "Tortue" (Tortoise) by the latter, she worked for her for the last ten years of her life. She wrote a biography of the last ten years of Alexandra David-Néel's life. She has also edited Alexandra's writings, including her extensive correspondence with her husband from 1904 to 1940 (in 2 volumes).

== Biography ==
Marie-Madeleine Peyronnet was born on 30 June 1930 in De Foucauld (French Algeria, now Rechaiga, Algeria). She grew up in Rechaïga, Algeria, where her family has been settled for four generations. Her father, a former soldier, was a civil servant. Marie-Madeleine was raised in a strict, bourgeois Catholic family, but dreamed only of traveling.

At the age of 29, after spending all her youth in Algérois, Marie-Madeleine came to stay with her sister, who owned a hotel, in Aix-en-Provence. It was during this stay that she met by chance Alexandra David-Néel, who was herself staying in Aix and looking for a secretary. Marie-Madeleine was initially hired for three months as a private secretary, but she remained in the service of the explorer for the last ten years of her life in Digne-les-Bains

Having inherited the right to live at Samten Dzong (in Tibetan : "Fortress of Meditation"), Alexandra David-Néel's home, she contributed to the republication of the work written by the explorer in Digne-les-Bains (Alpes-de-Haute-Provence) after the latter's death on 8 September 1969

In 1977, she founded the Alexandra David-Néel Association. This is a not-for-profit association under French law, which has developed the museum by enriching its collections.

Employed by the town of Digne-les-Bains, Marie-Madeleine Peyronnet managed the museum until 1995, organising the daily reception of tourists and French and foreign VIPs accompanied by their translators, including Tibetan visitors such as the 14th Dalai Lama in 1982 and 1986, Tibetan folk troupes, musicians, other artists (butter and wood sculptors) and monks who came to make sand mandala which were then exhibited in the museum.

Marie-Madeleine collected and published the Lettres à son mari (Letters to her husband) and other posthumous books by Alexandra David-Néel. In 1973, she published a biography, Dix ans avec Alexandra David-Néel, transferring the copyright to the association. The book, written in three weeks, was published by Plon and won the Prix des Journalistes (The Journalists' Prize) and was shortlisted for the Prix Vérité. A new edition was published in 2005, with five additional texts added in 2003 when a German translation was published by Nymphenburger Verlag.

A biography of Marie-Madeleine Peyronnet was written and published in 2018 by Joëlle Désiré-Marchand, who had already published a biography of Alexandra David-Néel in 2009.

She died on 24 April 2023 in Digne-les-Bains.

== Nicknamed “Tortue” ==
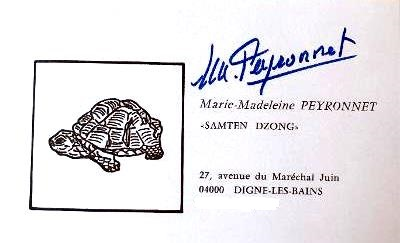
Visiting card with a framed Tortoise, signed by Marie-Madeleine Peyronnet.

Alexandra David-Néel gave Marie-Madeleine the nickname “Tortue” (Tortoise) after a banal incident. As she walked towards a staircase, she saw a stocking rolled into a ball at her feet, which she mistook for a tortoise. After calling Marie-Madeleine to ask her to take it off and look after it, they discovered together, bursting into laughter, the true nature of the object. From that day on, Alexandra nicknamed her “Tortue”, first out of amusement, then out of habit.

== Awards ==

Ordre des Arts et des Lettres Chevalier (Knight),(1996).

== Works ==
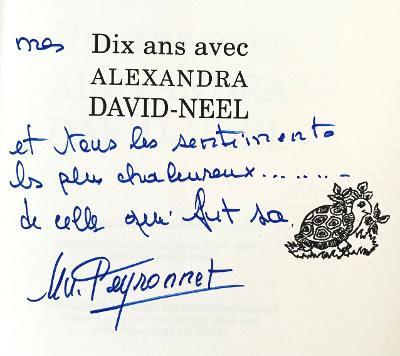
Dedication., signature and stamp of Marie-Madeleine Peyronnet

=== Autobiography ===
- Plon, ed. (1973). Dix ans avec Alexandra David-Néel (in French). (Plon) réédition numérique FeniXX. p. 256. ISBN 9782259288828., (A digital reprint is available).

=== Comics ===
Anne-Marie Peyronnet took part in writing the script.

- Campoy, Frédéric (cartoonist); Blanchot, Mathieu (colorist) (2016). Bamboo Édition (ed.). Une vie avec Alexandra David-Néel, 4 albums, pp. 96, 96, 80, 96 (in French)., the last 3 albums were published in 2017, 2018 and 2020. A digital edition is available.

=== A. David-Néel's posthumous works edited by Marie-Madeleine Peyronnet ===
Between 1970 and 2018, twenty posthumous works have been published under the responsibility of M-M. Peyronnet. Here are just a few of them:

- Alexandra David-Néel (1975). Plon (ed.). Journal de voyage : Lettres à son mari, 1904-1917. Vol. 1 (in French). p. 445. ISBN 9782259002806.
- Alexandra David-Néel (1976). Plon (ed.). Journal de voyage : Lettres à son mari, 1918-1940. Vol. 2 (in French). p. 359. ISBN 2259015247.
- Alexandra David-Néel (1994). Plon (ed.). Grand Tibet et vaste Chine, récits et aventures (in French). (This book brings together 5 titles already published during Alex. David-Néel's lifetime, including : Au pays des brigands gentilshommes, Voyage d'une Parisienne à Lhassa, Sous des nuées d'orage,
  À l'ouest barbare de la vaste Chine, Le vieux Tibet face à la Chine nouvelle. A selection of documents has been added to the set).
- Alexandra David-Néel (1994). Albin Michel (ed.). Voyages et aventures de l'esprit (in French).. This is a selection of texts collected and presented by M-M. Peyronnet and French journalist / editor Marc de Smedt.
- Alexandra David-Néel (1979). Éditions du Rocher (ed.). Ashtavakra Gita & Avadhuta Gita (in French). p. 149. ISBN 2-268-016-90-0., combines two books published separately in 1951 and 1958.

=== Foreword ===
- Priscilla Telmon (2010). Actes Sud (ed.). Himalayas, sur les pas d'Alexandra David-Néel (in French). Actes Sud. p. 210. ISBN 978-2742793419., foreword by André Velter et Marie-Madeleine Peyronnet.

== Sources ==
- Chalon Jean (1986). Le lumineux destin d'Alexandra David-Néel (in French). Librairie académique Perrin, Paris. p. 557. ISBN 2-266-14357-3., passage quoted: page 452 .
- Désiré-Marchand, Joelle (2018). Rose des sables et lion des neiges, La vie singulière de Marie-Madeleine Peyronnet, secrétaire d'Alexandra David-Néel (in French). Paris: Les Nuits rouges. p. 240. ISBN 978-2913112629..
