= Bhutia Boarding School, Darjeeling =

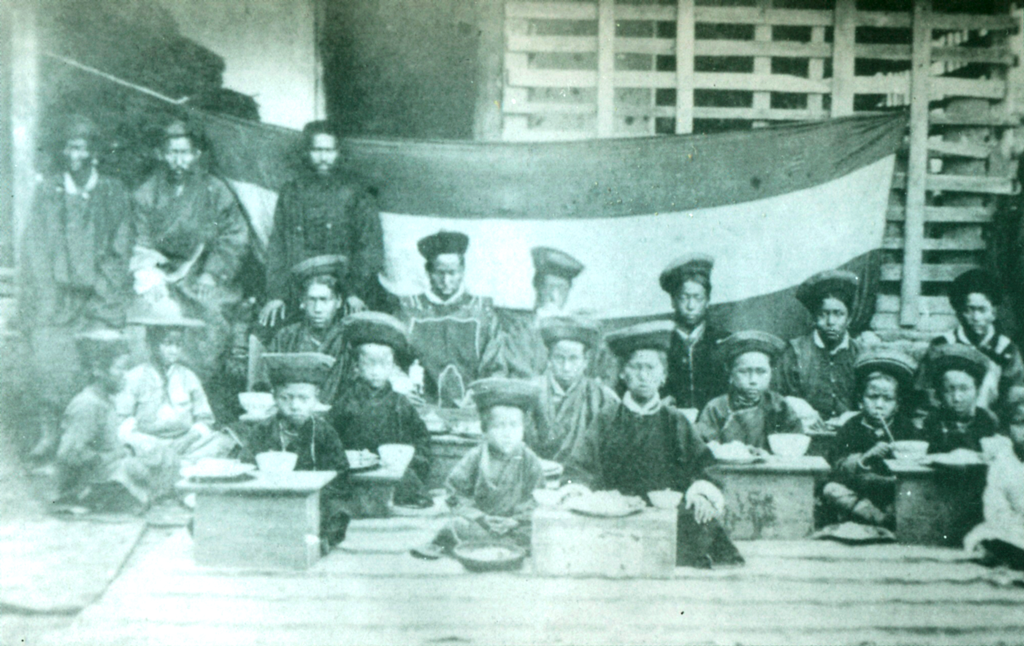
Staff and students of the Bhutia Boarding School, Darjeeling, 1888 with Sarat Chandra Das standing in back, third from the left, and Ugyen Gyatso seated in the back row, fifth from the right.

The Bhutia Boarding School in Darjeeling is a school founded in 1874. Its first director was Sarat Chandra Das and Professor of Tibetan Ugyen Gyatso, a monk of Tibeto- Sikkimese origin. It was opened by order of the Lieutenant Governor of British Bengal, Sir George Campbell. Its purpose was to provide education to young Tibetans and Sikkimese boys resident in Sikkim or the Darjeeling area. However, according to Derek Wallers, it aimed to train interpreters, geographers and explorers may be useful in the event of an opening of Tibet to the English. Students learnt English, Tibetan and topography. In 1879, Sarat Chandra Das, sometimes disguised as a Tibetan lama, sometimes as a merchant from Nepal and Ugyen Gyatso made several trips to Tibet as secret agents of British India services in order to establish and collect cards.

The opening coincided with the school 's educational initiatives William Macfarlane, a Scottish missionary in the region. If there was no link between these two initiatives, there was also no tension between them, sharing the same goals and methods with mutual benefit.

In 1891, the boarding school merged with the Darjeeling Zilla School to form the Darjeeling High School.

== Bhutia Boarding School ==
- Kazi Dawa Samdup
- David Macdonald, (1870-1962)

== Darjeeling High School ==
- Norbu Dhondup, (1884-1944)
- Pemba Tsering, (1905-1954)
- Ekai Kawaguchi
- Karma Sumdhon Paul (alias Karma Babu). He later became director of the school.
