= Five Tibetan Rites =

Sequence of yoga exercises

The Eye of Revelation by Peter Kelder

The Five Tibetan Rites is a system of exercises first described by Peter Kelder in a 1939 booklet titled The Eye of Revelation, published in Los Angeles, California. Later authors refer to the exercises as "The Five Rites", "The Five Tibetans" and "The Five Rites of Rejuvenation". Kelder described the rites as having the potential to restore youthfulness through changing one's internal "vortexes". There is no evidence of the exercises being authentic Tibetan practices. The rites have been reprinted in multiple expanded editions and translations, and have been popular among New Age practitioners.

== Origins and publications ==
=== Origins ===
Kelder claimed that the rites were more than 2,500 years old, but there is no evidence to support this claim. Some of the movements have similarities to Tibetan trul khor (yantra yoga), but only some versions of the rites integrate breath with the movement, which is fundamental to yantra yoga. Tibetans have not recognized the rites as being authentic Tibetan practices. John Michael Greer, a writer on occult topics, described the rites as inspired by Indian spiritual practices but of American origin. Greer writes that the dietary advice in the booklet is similar to the contemporary Hay diet, and that the second, third, fourth, and fifth rites seem similar to hatha yoga as described by American books published in the early 1900s as part of the physical culture movement, which was influenced by German-American gymnastics clubs. Greer also draws a connection between the first rite and the American spiritualist movement.

=== Historical context ===
Kelder published the first version of The Eye of Revelation in 1939 and an expanded edition in 1946, using a small publishing company in Los Angeles that published booklets related to occult topics. This followed a period of Western interest in Tibet as a source of ancient wisdom. In 1924, William Montgomery McGovern, billed as the first American in Tibet, published To Lhasa in Disguise, a Secret Expedition through Mysterious Tibet. Three years later, American anthropologist Walter Evans-Wentz published an English translation of The Tibetan Book of the Dead.

The English translation of French explorer Alexandra David-Néel's memoir With Mystics and Magicians in Tibet was published in 1931. In it, she describes learning a Tibetan yoga practice from a lama. Evans-Wentz published Tibetan Yoga and Secret Doctrines in 1935. Starting in 1938, the American "White Lama" Theos Casimir Bernard's lectures and publications "established a firm link between the physical culture of Indian hatha yoga and the spiritual mysticism associated in the minds of many with the ritual practices of Tibetan Buddhism."

The 1933 novel Lost Horizon and its 1937 film adaptation featured a fictional remote Tibetan monastery, Shangri-La, where people stay youthful into old age. In The Eye of Revelation, Kelder claimed to have met a retired British army colonel who shared with him stories of travel to a remote Tibetan monastery and subsequent discovery of the rites and their youthful effect.

=== Revival ===
The original 1939 version of The Eye of Revelation was reprinted by the Borderland Sciences Research Foundation in 1975, and the book was republished in an expanded edition in 1985 as Ancient Secret of the Fountain of Youth. The 1988 bestseller Modern Magick by Donald Michael Kraig included a description of the rites. By the early 1990s, versions of Kelder's book were sold in stores alongside other New Age topics.

Chris Kilham, whose 1994 book The Five Tibetans contributed to the popularity of the exercises, is an example of practitioners who do not insist on a literal interpretation of Kelder's story. He wrote: "Whether or not the Five Tibetans are in fact Tibetan in origin is something we may never ascertain...[t]he issue at hand, though, is not the lineage of the Five Tibetans. The point is their immense potential value for those who will clear 10 minutes a day to practice."

Kelder's work has been republished and expanded several more times. It has been translated into more than a dozen languages. The first German edition was published in 1989, and it was on a bestseller list there for years.

== Story ==
In The Eye of Revelation, Kelder claims that, while stationed in India, British army officer Colonel Bradford (a pseudonym) heard a story about a group of lamas who had apparently discovered a "Fountain of Youth". Local people told him about old men who became healthy, strong, and full of "vigor and virility" after entering a particular lamasery. After retiring, Kelder's Colonel Bradford went on to discover the lamasery and lived there with the lamas, who taught him five exercises, which they called "rites". According to the booklet, the lamas described seven spinning "psychic vortexes" within the body: "two...in the brain; one at the base of the throat, another in the right side of the body in the region of the liver; one in the sexual center; and one in each knee." The booklet says that as a person grows older, the spin rate of the "vortexes" diminishes, resulting in "ill-health", but the spin rate of these "vortexes" can be restored by performing the Five Rites daily, resulting in improved health.

== Performing the rites ==
In the original The Eye of Revelation booklet, Kelder suggests to "stand erect with hands on hips between the Five Rites and take one or two deep breaths". He neither implies nor suggests that specific breathing patterns should be adopted while performing the movements. Expanded publications from Five Tibetans teachers recommend and detail specific instructions for breathing while performing the exercises. Practitioners also recommend taking caution before performing the rites due to the possibility of their causing dizziness, aggravating certain health conditions, or overstraining the body. For example, one teacher suggested warming up first, going slowly, and keeping the head and neck in alignment, while another suggested consulting a yoga instructor before trying the rites.

In The Eye of Revelation, Kelder claims that Mevlevi Order dervishes spin clockwise – hence the direction of the first rite – but they spin counter-clockwise.

Five Tibetan Rites as described in original booklet
Rite number one

Rite number two

Rite number three

Rite number four

Rite number five

== Effects ==
Kelder wrote that Bradford became dramatically younger in appearance after spending time at the lamasery and engaging in the rites. A 1998 edition of Ancient Secret of the Fountain of Youth, published by Doubleday, presents testimonials about improved eyesight, restoration of color to gray hair, and anti-aging. However, that edition begins with a disclaimer that includes, "The exercises, dietary measures, and other advice regarding health matters outlined in this book are not suitable for everyone, and under certain circumstances they could lead to injury." In the early 1990s, the rites were referenced by fraudulent mailings that claimed to offer secrets of youth to seniors.

Some teachers and practitioners consider the rites' benefits to be similar to other yoga practices, such as reducing stress and improving well-being.
