= Carolinda Witt =

- Born: 1955; Kenya
- Website: Carolinda Witt - The Five Tibetan Rites - Double Agent Celery

Carolinda Witt (born 1955 in Kenya) is an author, former commercial hot-air balloon pilot and competitor. She is also a teacher and expert on The Five Tibetans, a yoga methodology originally described by Peter Kelder in his book "The Eye Of Revelation."

== Early years ==
Witt was born in Kenya. She attended Loreto Convent Msongari in Nairobi and represented Kenya in two international swimming competitions where she broke three national records: Kenya Junior Record, Girls 12 & Under 200 metres Backstroke; the Kenya Junior Record, and the Zambian Age Group All-Comers Record for the 100 metres backstroke.

In 1968 she continued her training with the former West German Freestyle Champion, with a view to competing in the Munich Olympics in 1972. In 1969 she broke her left shoulder in an accident putting an end to her swimming career and shortly afterwards her family moved to South Africa followed by the West Indies, England and Australia.

In 1984 Witt and her husband who individually tailored home dialysis equipment and supplies to patients throughout the United Kingdom, sold their company Unicare Medical Services, to Baxter Travenol Laboratories, part of the US Health Care Company Baxter International Inc and moved to Australia.

== Ballooning ==
Witt was 20 years old when she began hot air ballooning in England. She became a commercial hot air balloon pilot and competed in a number of national and international balloon competitions. In 1979, she and another balloon pilot, Lady Gwen Bellew attempted to become the first female balloon pilots to cross the English Channel, sponsored by Famous Grouse Whiskey. They were pipped at the post by another female pilot who got wind of their attempt and managed to beat them to the finish.

Witt, together with her friend Sheila Scott, the famous aviator who amongst her 100 flying records flew solo over the North Pole in 1956, flew her balloon throughout the UK drawing attention to the plight of otters whose habitat was being destroyed.

In 1988 Witt flew Richard Branson's Virgin Jumbo Jet shaped balloon from Perth to Sydney in the Australian Bicentenary Trans-Australia balloon race. As part of the pre-race publicity, Witt and her crew tethered a red Virgin balloon to a barge, and sailed it fully inflated past the Sydney Opera House, and under the Sydney Harbour Bridge.

== The Five Tibetan Rites teaching ==
Witt has practiced and studied yoga, meditation and breathing (Pranayama) since she was eighteen. In 2000 she was introduced to The Five Tibetan Rites through a teacher of the Five Rites, and began teaching them in workshops throughout Australia, New Zealand and the USA.

In the beginning, her teaching followed the methodology described by Peter Kelder in his 1939 book The Eye of Revelation. However this book contains very limited instructions and illustrations.

Witt developed a step-by-step method that makes the Rites easier and safer to learn, particularly for those who have difficulty with one or more of the movements or for people who need to modify the Rites to suit their individual anatomical variations.

== Writing ==
Witt is the granddaughter of Walter Dicketts, a British double agent code named Celery, who worked for MI5 during World War Two. Witt spent seven years researching and writing Walter Dicketts’ biography, called Double Agent Celery: MI5's Crooked Hero.

In 2018, this book won a non-fiction award from the Society of Women Writers NSW. Inc.

== Published works ==
- The Illustrated Five Tibetan Rites. (UnMind Pty Ltd, June 2006)
- The Five Tibetan Rites: Ancient Anti-Aging Secrets of the Five Tibetan Rites with Peter Kelder. (UnMind Pty Ltd, January 2014)
- T5T: The Five Tibetan Exercise Rites. (Penguin Books/Lantern, Sydney, January 2005)
- The 10-Minute Rejuvenation Plan- T5T The Revolutionary Exercise Program That Restores Your Body and Mind. (Random House/Clarkson Potter, New York, April 2007)
- Viis Tiibeti riitust illustratsioonidega. (Ersen, Estonia, October 2018)
- Double Agent Celery - MI5's Crooked Hero. (Pen & Sword Books, UK, October 2017)
