= S. Mahinda =

Sikkimese Buddhist monk

S. Mahinda Thera
- පූජ්‍ය එස්. මහින්ද හිමි
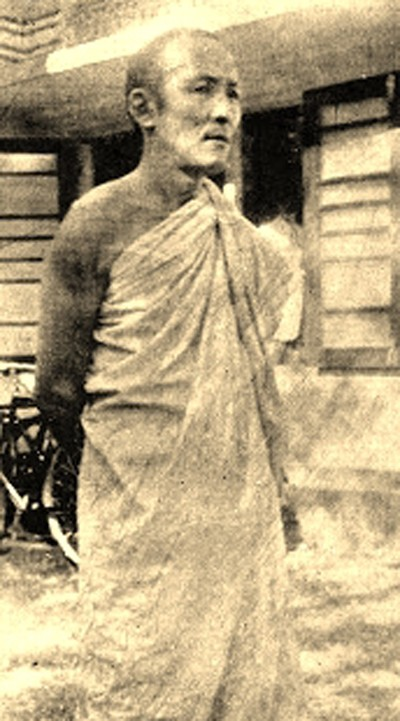

Personal life
- Born: Pempa Tendupi Serky Cherin; 1901 Gangtok, Kingdom of Sikkim
- Died: 16 March 1951 (aged 49–50) Sri Lanka
- Notable work(s): Nidahase Dehena, Nidahase Manthraya, Lanka Matha, Jathika Thotilla, Ada Lak Mawage Puttu, Nidahasa, Videshikayakugen Lak Mawata Namaskarayak, Sinhala Jathiya
- Education: Vidyodaya Pirivena, Maradana
- Known for: Poet, Author, Sri Lankan Independence Movement
- Other names: Sikkim Mahinda, Tibet Jathika S. Mahinda Himi

Religious life
- Religion: Theravada Buddhism
- School: Theravada
- Dharma name: Ven. Tibet Sikkim Mahinda Thera

Venerable Sikkim Mahinda Thera (Sinhala: සිකිම් මහින්ද හිමි), commonly known as S. Mahinda Thera (Sinhala: එස්‌. මහින්ද හිමි), was a Buddhist monk from the former country Sikkim. He was a poet and author, and participated in the Sri Lankan independence movement. Although he was from Sikkim, he identified himself as a Tibetan, presumably because it was more well known in Ceylon (now Sri Lanka).

S. Mahinda Thera arrived in Ceylon (now Sri Lanka) at a young age and was ordained as a Buddhist monk by Ven. Dodanduwa Sri Piyaratana Tissa Mahanayake Thera. Having learned the Sinhala language, he became a poet, creating several literary works inspiring patriotism among the Sinhalese and urging them to fight for their freedom during the Sri Lankan Independence movement. He is now considered a national hero of Sri Lanka and among the greatest of Sinhalese poetry figures of all time.

== Early life ==
Sikkim Mahinda was born around 1901 in Sikkim and named Pempa Tendupi Serky Cherin. His family lived in Gangtok, the capital of Sikkim. He had three brothers; the first would later become a lecturer of the University of Calcutta, the second would be the prime minister of the king, and the third would join the Buddhist priesthood who was known as Punnaji Thera. Their elder half-brother, who looked after the family following the death of their father, was Kazi Dawa Samdup. His childhood friend Tashi Namgyal would become the King of Sikkim. S. Mahinda had used his name as a pseudonym in Sri Lanka, leading to the belief that it was his real name.

Serky received a scholarship, with an annual allowance of six rupees, to study Buddhism in Ceylon and arrived there in 1912 or 1914. At the time, the country was under British rule. Sikkim Punnaji, his elder brother who was already a Buddhist monk, accompanied him.

== Buddhist priesthood and life in Ceylon ==
The two brothers stayed at the Island Hermitage in Polgasduwa, southern Ceylon, and learned Buddhism under the German monk Nyanatiloka. He was then sent to the Vidyodaya Pirivena in Maradana, and admitted to Maradana Mahabodhi Vidyalaya to learn English. After this, he returned to the Island Hermitage, and learned Sinhala and Pali languages. With the outbreak of World War I, his mentor Nyanatiloka Thera was arrested. His brother Sikkim Punnaji also appears to have died around this time, while he was himself interned twice by the government.

He was later ordained into the Amarapura Nikaya as Sikkim Mahinda, although he used his name as S. Mahinda. He was re-ordained into the Siyamopali Nikaya on 16 June 1930, and obtained Upasampada later that year. He identified himself as a Tibetan, presumably because it was better known in Ceylon and was a leading Buddhist country in Asia. S. Mahinda Thera served as a teacher at Nalanda College, Colombo from 1934 to 1936.

== Literary work and nationalism ==
S. Mahinda soon became fluent in the Sinhala language, and established himself as a poet and author. He has written over 40 books, most of them are poems inspiring patriotism. His first book was Ova Muthu Dama, which was written around 1921. His final book is believed to be Sri Pada. He also appears to have created a number of unpublished works. In his works, he has focused on the past glory of the country, and the weaknesses of its people in the present, urging them to work towards their freedom. He also wrote several books for children as well, and in these too he has tried to inspire patriotism upon the reader. His most famous works include Nidahase Dehena, Nidahase Manthraya, Lanka Matha, Jathika Thotilla, Ada Lak Mawage Puttu, Nidahasa, Videshikayakugen Lak Mawata Namaskarayak and Sinhala Jathiya.

He was also a member of the temperance movement, which served as the basis for the independence movement of Sri Lanka. After the country gained independence in 1948, he was acknowledged as a national hero for his literary works inspiring the independence movement. He died on 16 March 1951.

== See also ==
- Sagara Palansuriya
