= A Journey to Lhasa and Central Tibet =

1902 book by Sarat Chandra Das

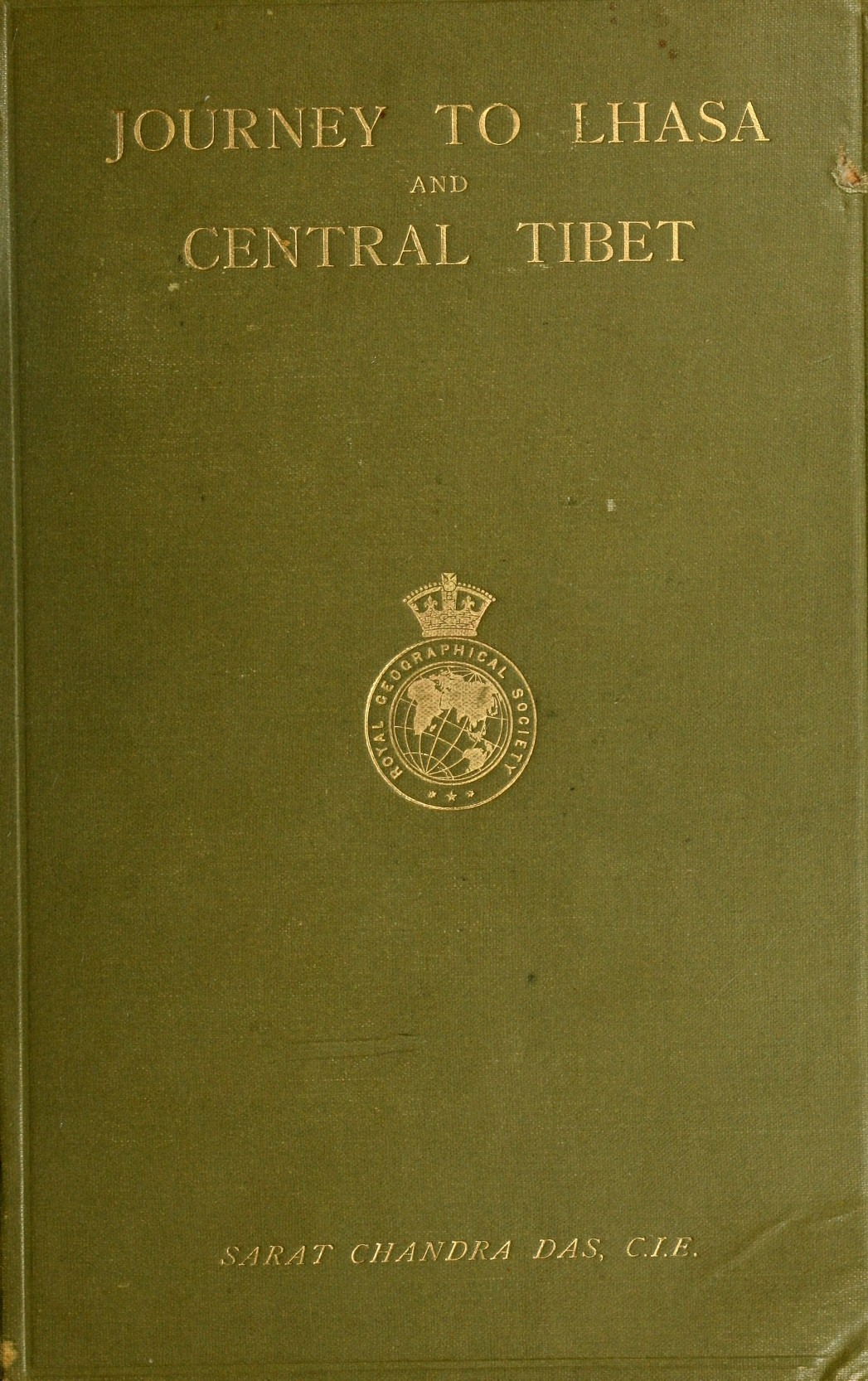
- Second edition cover
- Author: Sarat Chandra Das
- Genre: Travel literature
- Publisher: John Murray, E. P. Dutton
- Publication date: 1902
- Text: A Journey to Lhasa and Central Tibet at Wikisource

A Journey to Lhasa and Central Tibet is a nonfiction book written by Sarat Chandra Das, published in 1902. It is a travelogue of Das' second visit to Tibet in 1881 under the orders of the British Raj.

== Initial reception ==
The British magazine The Athenaeum liked the book's inclusion of illustrations of buildings and a photograph of Lhasa, but viewed the images of mountains towards the book's end as being irrelevant to its content.

The Academy and Literature called the book "the most authentic account of Tibet now extant" and said that Das positions himself as a "shrewd observer, remarkably well-informed, a man of courage and resource."
