= A Stranger in Tibet =

Book by Scott Berry

A Stranger in Tibet: The Adventures of a Wandering Zen Monk
- First edition
- Author: Scott Berry
- Genre: Biography/History/Travel
- Publisher: Kodansha International
- Publication date: Hardcover 1989, Paperback 1990
- Media type: Print (Hardcover and paperback)
- Pages: 314
- ISBN: 0-87011-858-7

A Stranger in Tibet is the story of Ekai Kawaguchi and his travels in Tibet and Nepal at the turn of the 20th century. Kawaguchi, a Zen Buddhist monk, was the first Japanese explorer to enter Nepal, in 1897, and Tibet, in 1900. His goal was to find ancient copies of sanskrit documents related to Buddhism. Since Tibet was closed to foreigners at that time, Kawaguchi travelled disguised as a Chinese monk. The book is a combination biography, travel book and history of the region, and also explains differences in the beliefs and practices of different schools of Buddhism.

"...ultimately, Zen came to represent the antithesis of Tantric Buddhism with its elaborate secret doctrines and equally complex artistic tradition. Tantric Buddhists tend to offer great respect to images and paintings, while a Zen master once made a point of burning a statue of the Buddha to keep warm. As much as Kawaguchi might at times disagree with certain aspects of Zen, particularly its aversion to book learning, the very fact that he came from a tradition so far removed from Tibet's Tantrism seemed to put him on a collision course with that country right from the beginning."

— A Stranger in Tibet, p. 34
