= Elise Wortley =

British explorer

- Born: 1989 or 1990 (age 35–36)
- Occupation: Explorer

Elise Wortley (born 1989 or 1990) is a British explorer who uses equipment and clothing from the early 1900s for her journeys.

Wortley grew up in Colchester, Essex before moving to London in 2017.

Inspired by early 20th century French explorer and author Alexandra David-Néel, Wortley has re-created several of David-Néel's journeys, including Kangchenjunga in the Himalayas, Lhasa in Tibet, the Scottish Highlands, the Alborz mountains in Iran, and the Ben Nevis mountain in Scotland.

Wortley will only use her handmade wooden backpack, a yak wool coat, Himalayan hobnail boots, cotton dress, and a linen tent. All things that her ancestors would have worn and used when they explored. Wortley planned her expedition, 108-mile hike from Lachen, in Sikkim, India, to Kanchenjunga base camp. The journey mimicked the last leg of David-Néel’s journey.
