= Swami Bhaskarananda Saraswati =

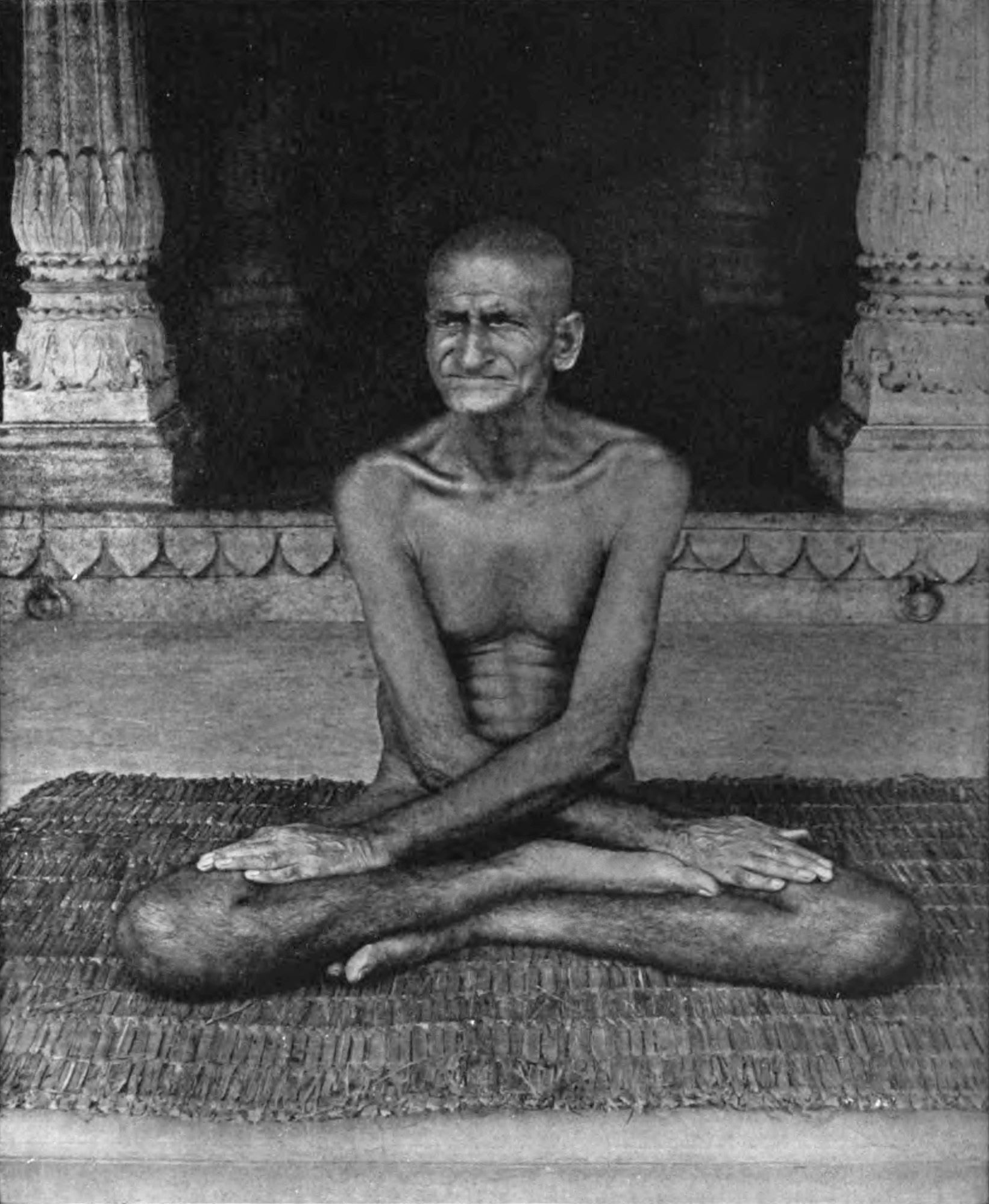

Personal life
- Born: Matiram; 1833 Marag maitha, Kanpur Dehat, Uttar Pradesh
- Died: 9 July 1899 (aged 65–66) Varanasi, Uttar Pradesh, India

Religious life
- Religion: Hinduism

Religious career
- Teacher: Poornanand Saraswati & Annantram

Swami Bhaskarananda Saraswati (1833–1899) was a noted 19th-century sannyasin and saint of Varanasi, India. He wandered over India for thirteen years before settling in Anandabag near the Durga Mandir, in 1868. A Sanskrit and Vedic scholar turned ascetic of Dashanami Dandi sannyasi order, many kings visited him to seek advise, and he also reported to be an advisor counsel to Kashi Naresh (Maharaja of Kingdom of Kashi), today his samadhi shrine is situated at Durga Kunda, adjacent to the historic Durga Mandir in Varanasi.

== Biography ==
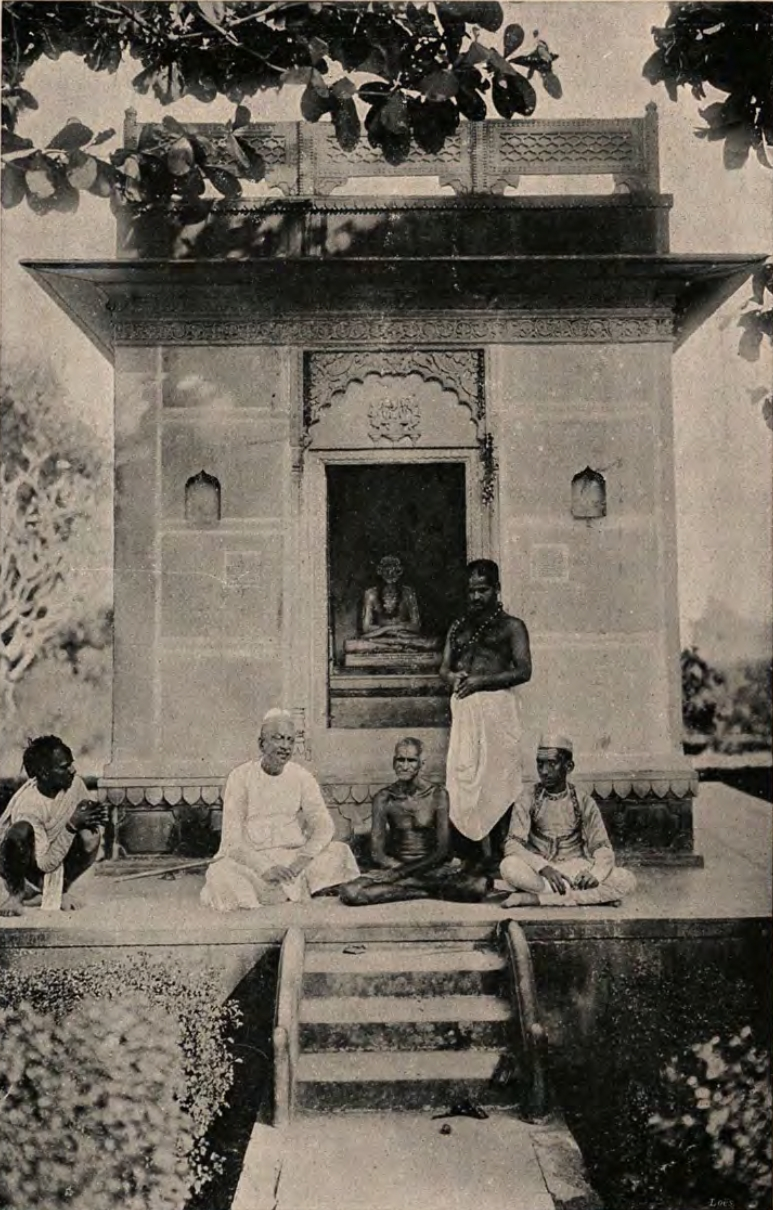
c. 1925

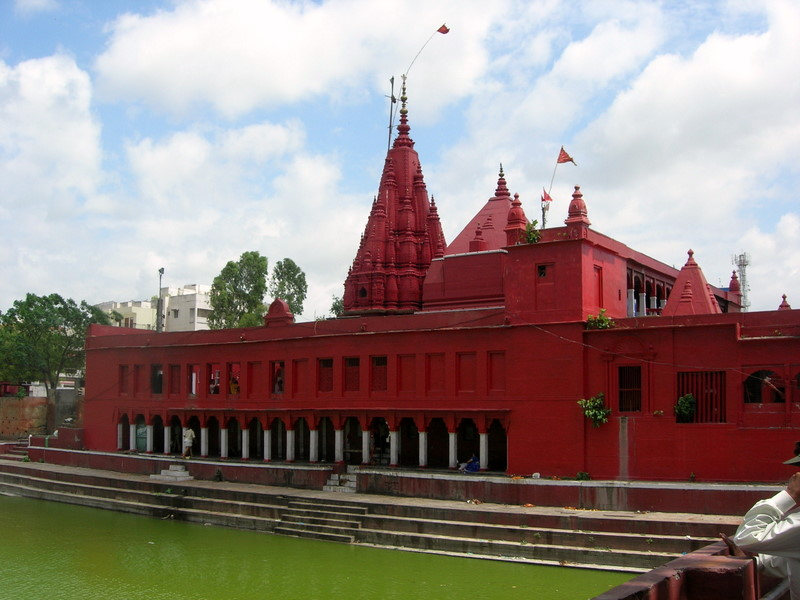
Durga Kund (pond) adjacent to the Durga Mandir, where Swami Bhaskarananda's samadhi shrine lies, Varanasi

Swamiji's pre-monastic name was Matiram Misra. Born into a Brahmin family in Kanpur district, Uttar Pradesh, was invested with the sacred thread at the age of eight and was married at the age of twelve. From age eight to seventeen, he was a diligent and most successful student of Sanskrit. A son was born to him at the age of eighteen. By this event he was, in his own opinion, freed from any further social obligations. So one day he disappeared from his father's house and went on foot to Ujjain, where he put up a temple of Siva. He continued his Vedantic studies and also started practicing yoga. He then traveled to all the parts of India and devoted to study Vedanta philosophy from noted masters including Pandit Anant Ram of Patna, who was at Haridwar at the time. At about age 27, he was initiated into the holy order of Sannyas by Paramahamsa Swami Purnananda Saraswati of Ujjain, and christened Swami Bhaskarananda Saraswati, a name by which he was known afterwards.

For thirty-five years Swami traveled around India, always practicing tapas. From his long ineffable knowledge he had desired, he settled down for the remainder of his life in the sacred city of Varanasi and miracles of healing were attributed to him.

Today, his samadhi shrine situated at Durga Kunda, adjacent to the historic Durga Mandir in Varanasi is maintained by a small trust.

== His followers ==
Alexandra David-Néel studied yoga with Bhaskarananda. Maharaja Jung Bahadur Rana, the King of Nepal and founder of the Rana dynasty of Nepal, has written a pamphlet about Swami. Ernest Binfield Havell (1864–1937), a close friend of Indologist Sir John Woodroffe was also devoted to him.

== In popular culture ==
He also finds mention in Mark Twain's non-fiction travelogue Following the Equator (1897), who met Swami in Varanasi. Apart from that American explorer couple, Fanny Bullock Workman and William Hunter Workman also met him at the Ananda Bagh garden.
