= Satish Chandra Vidyabhusan =

Bengali scholar (1870–1920)

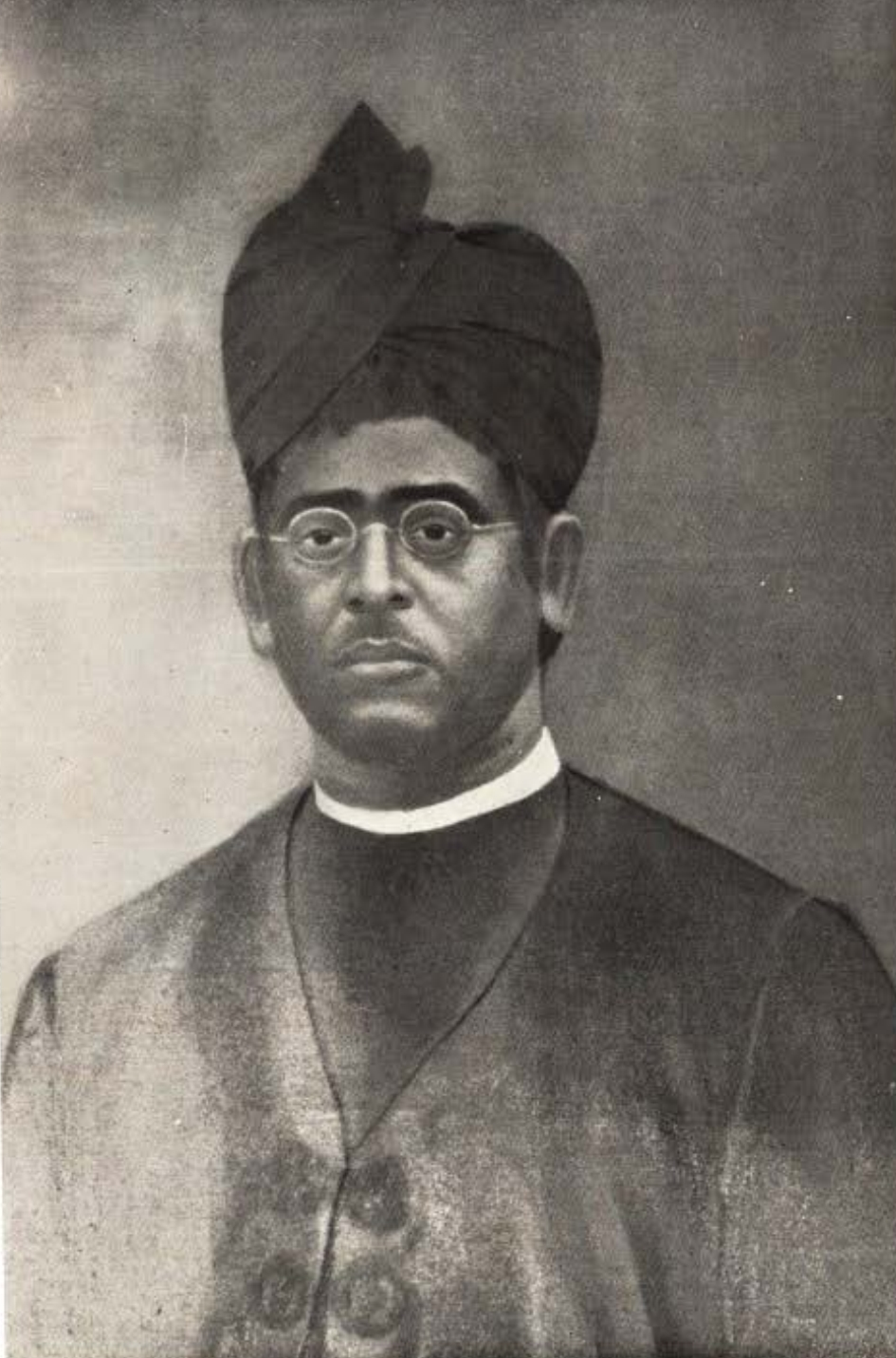

Satish Chandra Vidyabhusan (30 July 1870 – 25 April 1920) was a Bengali scholar of Sanskrit and Pali Language and principal of Sanskrit College.

== Early life ==
Satish Chandra Vidyabhusan was born in 1870 in Rajbari District, British India. His father Pitambar Vidyavagish was a Pandit and astronomer. In 1888, Satish Chandra passed entrance from Nabadwip Hindu School and in 1892, passed the B.A. with Sanskrit Honours from Krishnagar Government College with gold medal. He was the first Indian who obtained M.A. degree in Pali from Calcutta University.

== Career ==
Vidyabhushan was known for his distinguished knowledge in Indian logic and Tibetan Buddhist Text. He, along with Sarat Chandra Das, prepared Tibetan-English dictionary. Vidyabhusan went to Sri Lanka in 1910 for study and on his return he was appointed the Principal of Sanskrit College, Kolkata. He became the Assistant editor of the Buddhist Text Society. He edited magazine of Bangiya Sahitya Parisad for 22 years. Vidyabhushan was a linguist having knowledge in Buddhist literature, Chinese, Japanese, German and French language. Vidyabhushan has a number of books on Buddhist Tibetan culture, logic, Sanskrit and Systems of Indian Philosophy. In 1906 he received the title of Mahamahopadhyaya. and got Ph.D. in 1908.

== Bibliography ==
1. History of the Mediaeval School of Indian Logic (1909), Calcutta, published by The Calcutta University
2. The Nyaya Sutras of Gautama: Original Text, English Translation & Commentary (1913), Bahadurganj, published by The Panini Office
3. A Bilingual Index of Nyaya-Bindu (1917), Calcutta, published by The Asiatic Society
4. A History of Indian Logic (1921), Calcutta, published by The Calcutta University
