= With Mystics and Magicians in Tibet =

1929 book by Alexandra David-Néel

- Title page for With Mystics and Magicians in Tibet (1931)
- Author: Alexandra David-Néel
- Publication date: 1929
- English publication date: 1931

With Mystics and Magicians in Tibet, translated from the French original version Mystiques et Magiciens du Tibet , is a travel account of Tibetan religion and mystical practices written by Alexandra David-Néel. It is an account of David-Néel's experiences during her journey in the Himalayas, living among religious Buddhist authorities, monks, and mystics. The author gathered stories of her encounter with, mainly Buddhist, religious masters and entities while traveling in the region of India, Sikkim, Nepal, Bhutan, China, Japan, and particularly Tibet. The book was firstly published in 1929 in France and was later translated into different languages including English. The English translation was first published in 1931. The book contains an introduction written by Jaques-Arsène D'Arsonval.

== Background ==
In the early twentieth century the representation of Inner Asia, especially Tibet, was floating between different perspectives. The colonialist perspective which dominated the discourse about Tibet during the nineteenth century represented the Himalayas' territories and populations as savage and only concerned with mysticism. The colonialists shared this image of Tibet in order to promulgate the ideals of Western superiority. The other dominant perspective of the early twentieth century was distancing from the colonialist's one, proposing a new understanding of Tibet. Concerning the cultural and religious matters this new conception of Tibet proposed a rediscovery of this country under a spiritual and appreciative lens. Tibet became in Western eyes an object of fantasies and a place of ancient and great spirituality. This interest in Tibetan spirituality was mainly caused by the shared feeling of decadence in the post-World War I European modern society. A symbol of the growing spiritual interest in Europe was the birth of the Theosophical Society. The engagement in the occult of this society, led it to frame Tibet as a land intrinsic to ancient wisdom. David-Néel's book shared this vision by proposing a positive, exotic, and spiritual image of Tibet, which went beyond the classic colonialist assertion of superiority and rivalry.

Alexandra David-Néel was a great admirer of Oriental cultures and mysticism, as she herself was a Buddhist. She studied Oriental cultures at the University of Sorbonne and in 1892 she completed her studies at the Theosophical Society and took part in other esoteric communities, such as the Freemason. It is in these societies that she developed her interest in the occult and Oriental spirituality. David-Néel's interest in Oriental religion and culture was strongly connected with her political and societal beliefs. She was highly involved in anarchist and feminist movements and she often wrote articles about Oriental sages and philosophers. David-Néel was particularly interested in Buddhism because she saw in this religion the solution to the oppressive women's condition in Western society. She conceived Buddhism as the end to all hierarchies and the end to the illusion of the Catholic God. Her interest in Buddhism and the desire to escape modern society brought David-Néel to embark on a fourteen years journey in the Himalayas. This travel ended up being the source of her literary production. Fundamental to David-Néel's travel was her husband, Philippe Néel, who sponsored her. In the preface of the book, David-Néel explained that she wrote the book after the great number of requests that followed the publication of her first book, My Journey to Lhasa (1929). The requests were coming from both Orientalist scholars and the public. She was asked to write a book describing her insight into Tibetan religions and spiritual practices since the previous book was not so specific about it.

== Synopsis ==
With Mystics and Magicians in Tibet is neither a travel journal nor an autobiography but a collection of studies of religious and mystical practices, occult traditions, and psychic trainings in Tibet and the surrounding areas. David-Néel described the events that brought her in contact with Lamaism (a term used to describe Tibetan Buddhism) and magicians that surrounded that religion. Then she groups multiple mystical theories and beliefs that she learned during her stages in the Gompas, in the presence of religious authorities and yogi hermits in the remote caves of the Himalayas. She illustrated the monastic system of Lamaism, the great teachers and the training of their disciples. David-Néel described in detail what in her words are the 'Psychic Sports', a set of practices done by Tibetan monks and mystics to achieve supernatural results, such as surviving naked in the snow with the self-heating technique 'Tumo'. David-Néel claimed to have experienced many of the phenomena she described.

== Publication history ==
Mystiques et Magiciens du Tibet was originally published on January 1, 1929, by Édition Plon in France, written in French. The first English translation by John Lane the Bodley Head was published in 1931 and later published by the Penguin Books in 1936. Shortly after the original publication, the book was translated into multiple European languages, such as German, Spanish, Czech, and Swedish. However, the English translation was the most successful, second only to My Journey to Lhasa (1929). The book was translated into Asian languages too, including Chinese and Annamite.

== Reception ==
Alexandra David-Néel was described in multiple ways after the publication of her books, such as 'the first French Buddhist', ' a great sage', and 'the White Lama'. There was a lot of appreciation for David-Néel's publications. She received the Gold Medal of the Geographical Society in France, was named a chevalier of the French Legion of Honour, received the Insigne of the Chinese Order of the Brilliant Star, and the silver medal of the Royal Belgian Geographical Society. Another proof of her success was the translation of her work into multiple languages, including Chinese. The reception of David-Néel's work in China was controversial since it was appreciated but the translation was highly changed from the original French version. The Chinese censorship modified parts of David-Néel's texts to favour an understanding of her books that would promote, and sometimes cover, Chinese colonialism. David-Néel writings rank among the most celebrated Western Buddhists' texts and contributed to the popularisation of the twenty-first century perception of Tibet and Tibetan Buddhism at large.

The reception of her publications wasn't always acknowledged as a reliable account of Tibet. For instance, David-Néel was accused of trickery by scholars such as Jeanne Denys, who tried to demonstrate that the female explorer never embarked on her long travel across the Himalayas by comparing her texts with the work of other explorers. One of the reasons why David-Néel was accused was her original way of writing, which differentiate hers from the male one and often raised suspicions. David-Néel was often perceived as a controversial figure due to her unconventional beliefs and anarchist feminist political values. Her writings were regarded in the same way because of their original and positive way of representing Tibetan cultures, although, still maintaining an imperialistic attitude. Scholars accused her of being too bound to her ambitions of being a great Orientalist and a remarkable Western woman to write an objective description of Tibet.
