= Foster Stockwell =

Foster Paul Stockwell (February 17, 1929 – October 12, 2023) was an American writer, historian and publishing consultant for Chinese publishers and authors.

== Biography ==
Foster Paul Stockwell was born in Bartlesville, Oklahoma on February 17, 1929. He was the son of Francis Olin and Esther Stockwell, two Methodist missionaries who went to Fuzhou, Fujian, in 1929 then to Chengdu, Sichuan, in 1939. Stockwell grew up and went to primary school in Chengdu, in southwestern China, in the 1940s.

His father, Olin Stockwell, spent two years in prison in the town of Chongqing as a suspected spy just after the establishment of the People's Republic of China and wrote a book about it: With God in Red China.

Foster Stockwell attended several universities. He married on December 16, 1955 (his wife's name: Rhoda). They have one child, Norman.

Foster Stockwell was the author of books dealing with subjects as diverse as religion in China, information storage and retrieval, American communes, the exploration of China, genealogical research, misinterpretations of the Bible.

Foster Stockwell visited China many times in the last decades.

Foster Stockwell was an editor for two major encyclopedias, a newspaper editor (Berrien County Record, Buchanan, Michigan, 1960–61), and a publishing consultant for Chinese publishers and authors. He lives in Des Moines, Washington.

Foster Stockwell died in Burien, Washington on October 12, 2023, at the age of 94.

== Works ==
- Boyang Zuo, Foster Stockwell (eds), Recent discoveries in Chinese archaeology: 28 articles by Chinese archaeologists describing their excavations, translated by Boyang Zuo, Foster Stockwell, Bowen Tang, Foreign Languages Press, 1984, 107 pages ISBN 0-8351-1162-8 ISBN 978-0-8351-1162-1
- Jichuang Hu, Foster Stockwell, Shuhan Zhao, Chinese economic thought before the seventeenth century, Foreign Languages Press, 1984, 107 pages ISBN 0-8351-1156-3 ISBN 9780835111560
- Mount Huashan, Famous Chinese mountains, Foreign Language Press, 1987, 120 pages ISBN 0-8351-1071-0 ISBN 9780835110716
- Religion in China Today, New World Press, (original 1993, second revised edition 2007), 277 pages ISBN 7-80005-184-6
- Foster Stockwell, Encyclopedia of American Communes, 1663–1963, Jefferson, North Carolina, 1998, 267 pages ISBN 0-7864-0455-8
- Tibet - Myth and Reality, by American historian Foster Stockwell, original source: China Today, April 1998, vol. 47, issue 4
- A History of Information Storage and Retrieval, McFarland & Company, 2001, 208 pages ISBN 0-7864-0840-5
- Highlights in the History of Exploration and Trade in China, Foreign languages Press, 2002, 272 pages ISBN 7-119-03179-1 ISBN 7119031791
- Westerners in China: A History of Exploration and Trade, Ancient Times Through the Present, McFarland, 2003, 187 pages ISBN 978-0-7864-1404-8 (reviewed in China Information October 2003 vol. 17 no. 2 146-147)
- A Sourcebook for Genealogical Research: Resources Alphabetically by Type and Location, McFarland, 2004, 336 pages ISBN 0-7864-1782-X
- The Bible Says: History of Abuses Committed in the Name of the Biblical Text, Lulu Press, 2007, 236 pages ISBN 978-1-4303-2298-6
