= Sarat Chandra Das =

Indian Tibetologist (1849–1917)

Sarat Chandra Das শরৎচন্দ্র দাশ
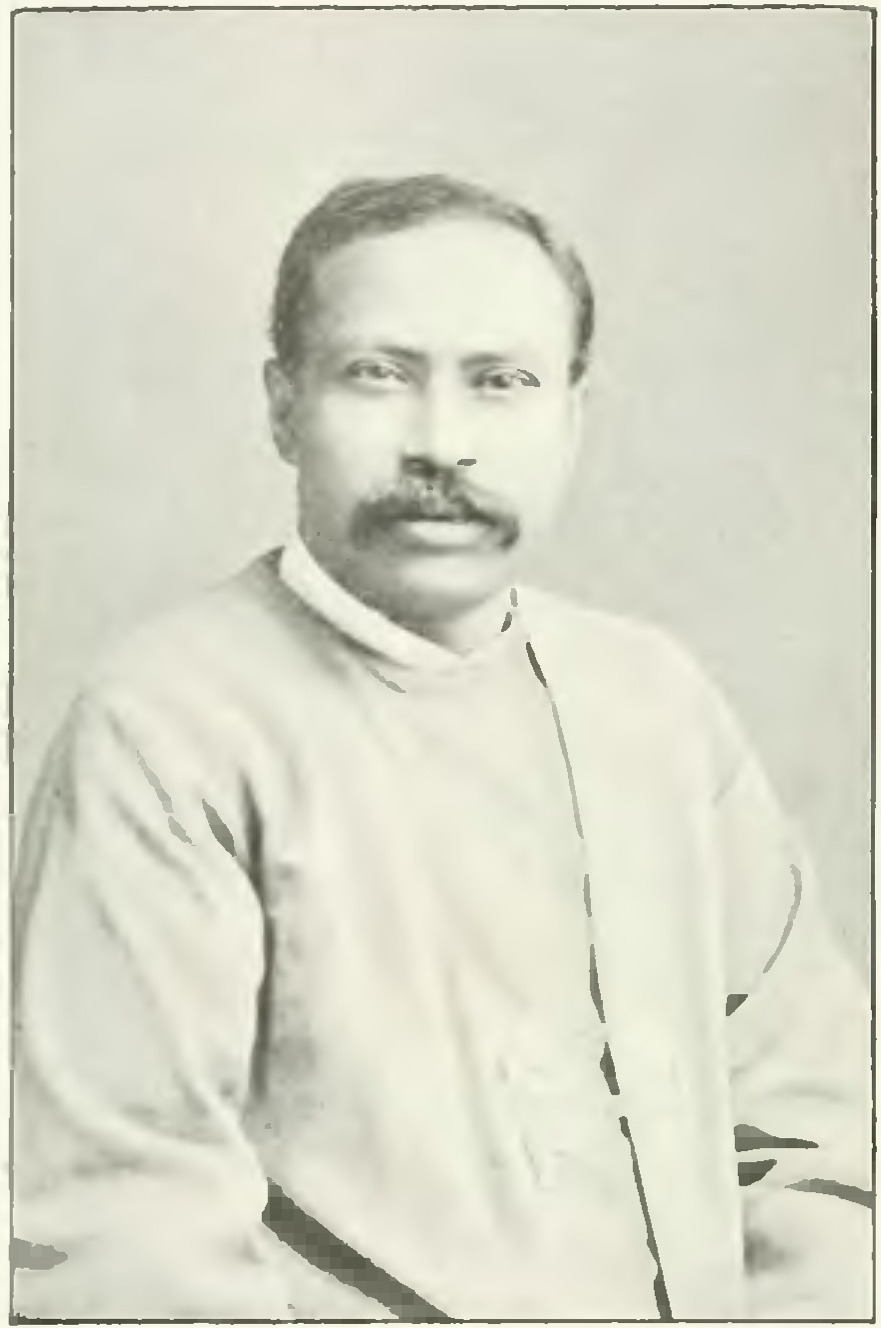
- Sarat Chandra Das
- Born: 18 July 1849; Chittagong, Bengal, British India
- Died: 5 January 1917 (aged 67); Chittagong, Bengal, British India
- Occupations: Explorer, Scholar, Spy
- Parent: Dindayal Dash

Sarat Chandra Das (Bengali: শরৎচন্দ্র দাশ) (18 July 1849 – 5 January 1917) was an Indian scholar of Tibetan language and culture most noted for his two journeys to Tibet in 1879 and in 1881–1882.

== Biography ==
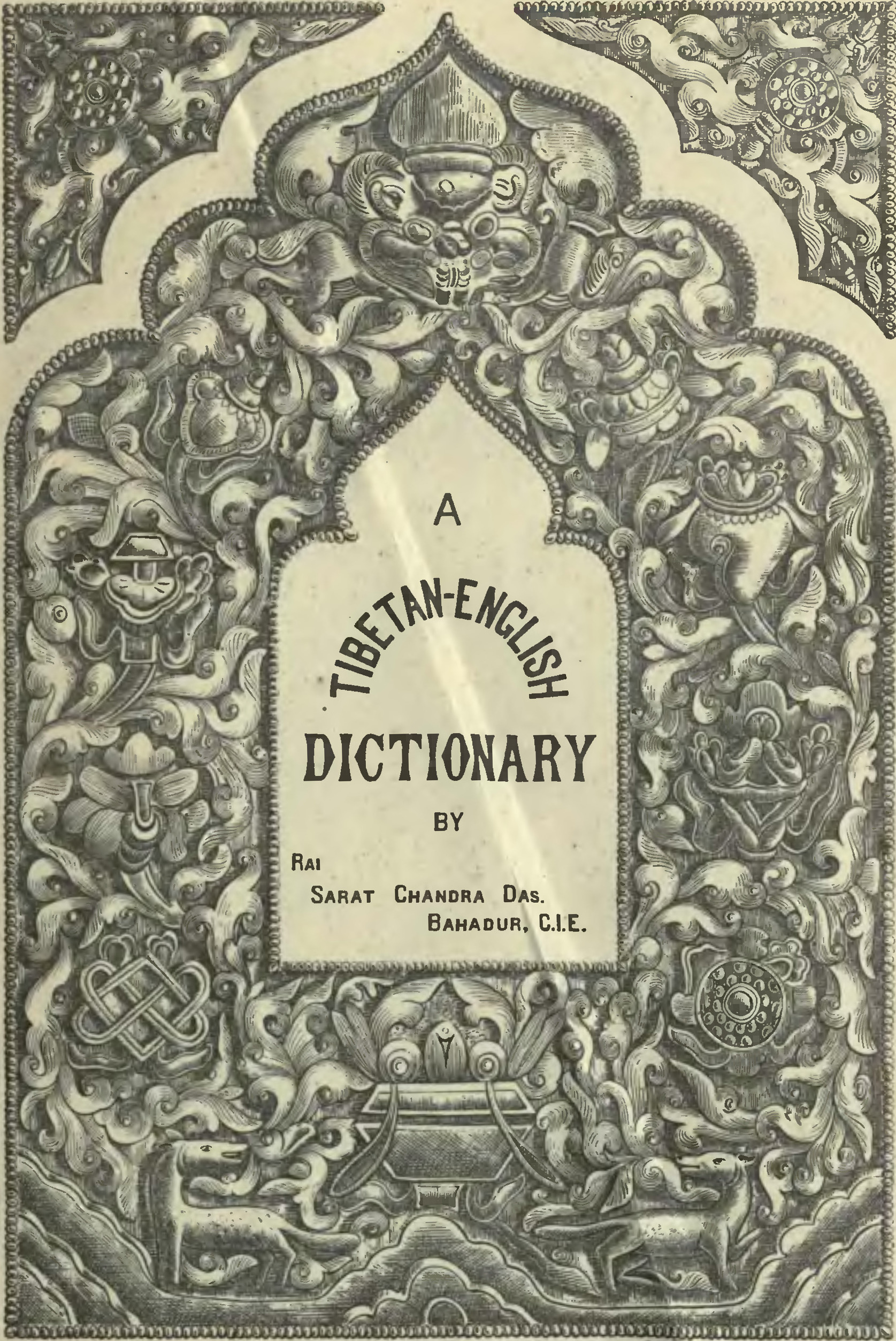
Gau art in detail, from the 1902 A Tibetan-English Dictionary with Sanskrit Synonyms

Born in Chittagong, eastern Bengal to a Bengali Hindu Vaidya-Brahmin family, Sarat Chandra Das attended Presidency College, as a student of the University of Calcutta. In 1874 he was appointed headmaster of the Bhutia Boarding School at Darjeeling. In 1878, a Tibetan teacher, Lama Ugyen Gyatso arranged a passport for Sarat Chandra to go the monastery at Tashilhunpo. In June 1879, Das and Ugyen-gyatso left Darjeeling for the first of two journeys to Tibet. They remained in Tibet for six months, returning to Darjeeling with a large collection of Tibetan and Sanskrit texts which would become the basis for his later scholarship. Sarat Chandra spent 1880 in Darjeeling poring over the information he had obtained. In November 1881, Sarat Chandra and Ugyen-gyatso returned to Tibet, where they explored the Yarlung Valley, returning to India in January 1883. Along with Satish Chandra Vidyabhusan, he prepared a Tibetan-English dictionary.

Recent research, however, indicates that much of the dictionary was a result of collaborative ventures with local Tibetan and Sikkimese born individuals from the Darjeeling-Sikkim region.

For a time, he worked as a spy for the British, accompanying Colman Macaulay on his 1884 expedition to Tibet to gather information on the Tibetans, Russians and Chinese. After he left Tibet, the reasons for his visit were discovered and many of the Tibetans who had befriended him suffered severe reprisals.

For the latter part of his life, Das settled in Darjeeling. He named his house "Lhasa Villa" and played host to many notable guests including Sir Charles Alfred Bell and Ekai Kawaguchi. Johnson stated that, in 1885 and 1887 Das met with Henry Steel Olcott, co-founder and first President of the Theosophical Society.

== Publications ==
- Contributions on the Religion, History &c., of Tibet. In Journal of the Asiatic Society of Bengal, Volume LI (51), Part I for 1882. Publisher: Asiatic Society, Calcutta (1882). Also, PDF file here
- Narrative of a journey to Lhasa in 1881-82. Publisher: s.n. (1885).
- Narrative of a journey round Lake Yamdo (Palti), and in Lhokha, Yarlung, and Sakya, in 1882. publisher: s.n (1887).
- Avadānakalpalatā: a collection of legendary stories about the Bodhisattvas. Asiatic Society (1890).
- The doctrine of transmigration. Buddhist Text Society (1893).
- Indian Pandits in the Land of Snow. Originally published at the end of the 19th century. Reprint: Rupa (2006).ISBN 978-8129108951.
- Sarat Chandra Das, Graham Sandberg & Augustus William Heyde A Tibetan-English dictionary, with Sanskrit synonyms. 1st Edition - Calcutta, 1902. Reprint: Sri Satguru Publications, Delhi, 1989 and Motilal Banarsidass, Delhi, 1970, 1973, 1976, 1979, 1983, 1991, 1995 and 2000.
- Journey To Lhasa & Central Tibet. 1st Edition: John Murray (England) (1902). Reprint: Kessinger Publishing, LLC (2007). ISBN 978-0-548-22652-0. Republished as: Lhasa and Central Tibet, Cosmo (Publications, India); New edition (2003). ISBN 978-81-7020-435-0.
- An introduction to the grammar of the Tibetan language;: With the texts of Situ sum-tag, Dag-je sal-wai melong, and Situi shal lung. Darjeeling Branch Press, 1915. Reprint: Motilal Banarsidass, Delhi, 1972 and 1983.
- Autobiography: Narratives of the incidents of my early life. Reprint: Indian studies: past & present (1969).
