= Lachen Monastery =

Nyingma Buddhist monastery in northeastern India

Religion
- Affiliation: Tibetan Buddhism
- Sect: Nyingma

Location
- Location: Sikkim, India
- Interactive map of Lachen Monastery
- Coordinates: 27.7162407°N 88.5566106°E

Architecture
- Completed: 1858

Lachen Monastery (also called Ngodrub Choling Gonpa, "Launching Gompa"), built in 1858, is a Nyingma Buddhist monastery near Lachen, Sikkim, northeastern India.

It is home to Lachen Monastic School.

== See also ==
- Buddhism
- Gautama Buddha
- History of Buddhism in India
- Buddhist pilgrimage sites in India
