= Jean Chalon =

French journalist and writer (born 1935)

Jean Chalon (born 8 March 1935) is a French journalist and writer. He first hesitated before a career as a Spanish teacher before deciding for journalism. He has spent most of his career at Le Figaro.

A lover of nature and a devotee of the feminine spirit, Jean Chalon published biographies spanning a diverse array of women. His subjects ranged from saints and writers to socialites and billionaires, including figures such as Marie Antoinette, Colette, and Thérèse de Lisieux, as well as the legendary flamenco dancer Lola Flores.

Chalon is a member of the jury of prix Alexandra-David-Néel/Lama-Yongden.

In 1994, Chalon was awarded the Prix Marcel Proust for Liane de Pougy, courtisane princesse et sainte.

== Bibliography ==
- Chère Marie-Antoinette
- Chère George Sand
- Chère Natalie Barney
- Le Lumineux Destin d’Alexandra David-Néel
- Journal d’un rêveur professionnel 2005-2007
- Liane de Pougy, courtisane, princesse et sainte, Flammarion, Prix Marcel Proust 1994
- Colette, L’éternelle apprentie
- Un arbre dans la lune, with Martine Delerm; album jeunesse
- Mémoires de Madame la Duchesse de Tourzel : Gouvernante des enfants de France de 1789 à 1795 avec la Duchesse de Tourzel, Carlos de Angulo
- Mémoires de Madame Campan, première femme de chambre de Marie-Antoinette, with Carlos de Angulo
- Florence et Louise les magnifiques : Florence Jay-Gould et Louise de Vilmorin
- La Lampe de sagesse avec Alexandra David-Néel
- Les Couples involontaires
- Thérèse de Lisieux, une vie d’amour
- La Guerre civile à 7 ans with Carlos de Angulo
- Mes quatre Déesses, with José Correa
- Le Diable ermite : Lettres à Jean Chalon 1968–1971 by François Augiéras and Jean Chalon
- Les chemins de Katmandou, followed by a dossier with inset photos on René Barjavel
- Les Bonheurs défendus
- L’Honneur de plaire
- Une jeune femme de 60 ans
- Journal d’un biographe, 1984-1997
- Collages de rêves
- Chère Lola Flores
- Journal d’un arbre, 1998-2001
- George Sand, une femme d’aujourd’hui
- L’avenir est à ceux qui s’aiment, ou, L’alphabet des sentiments
- Journal d’un lecteur : 2002-2004
- Zizou Artichaut Coquelicot Oiseau, illustrations by Alain Gauthier, Grasset Jeunesse, 1974

Prefaces

- La double tragédie de Misia Sert, by Alexander Rzewuski
- Francis de Miomandre, un Goncourt oublié, by Remi Rousselot, 2013

Postfaces

- Domme ou l’Essai d’occupation by François Augiéras

== Distinctions ==
He was made a chevalier of the Légion d'honneur on 14 July 2011.
