= Ekai Kawaguchi =

Japanese Buddhist monk

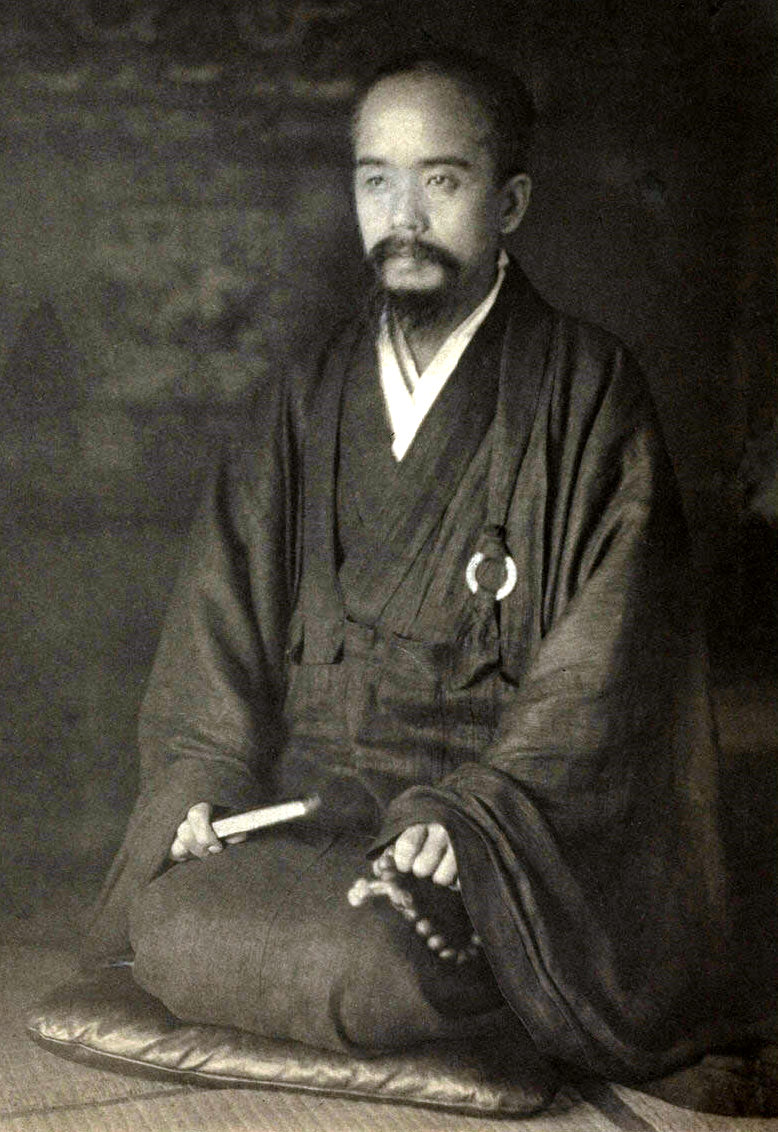
Kawaguchi in 1899, by Zaida Ben-Yusuf

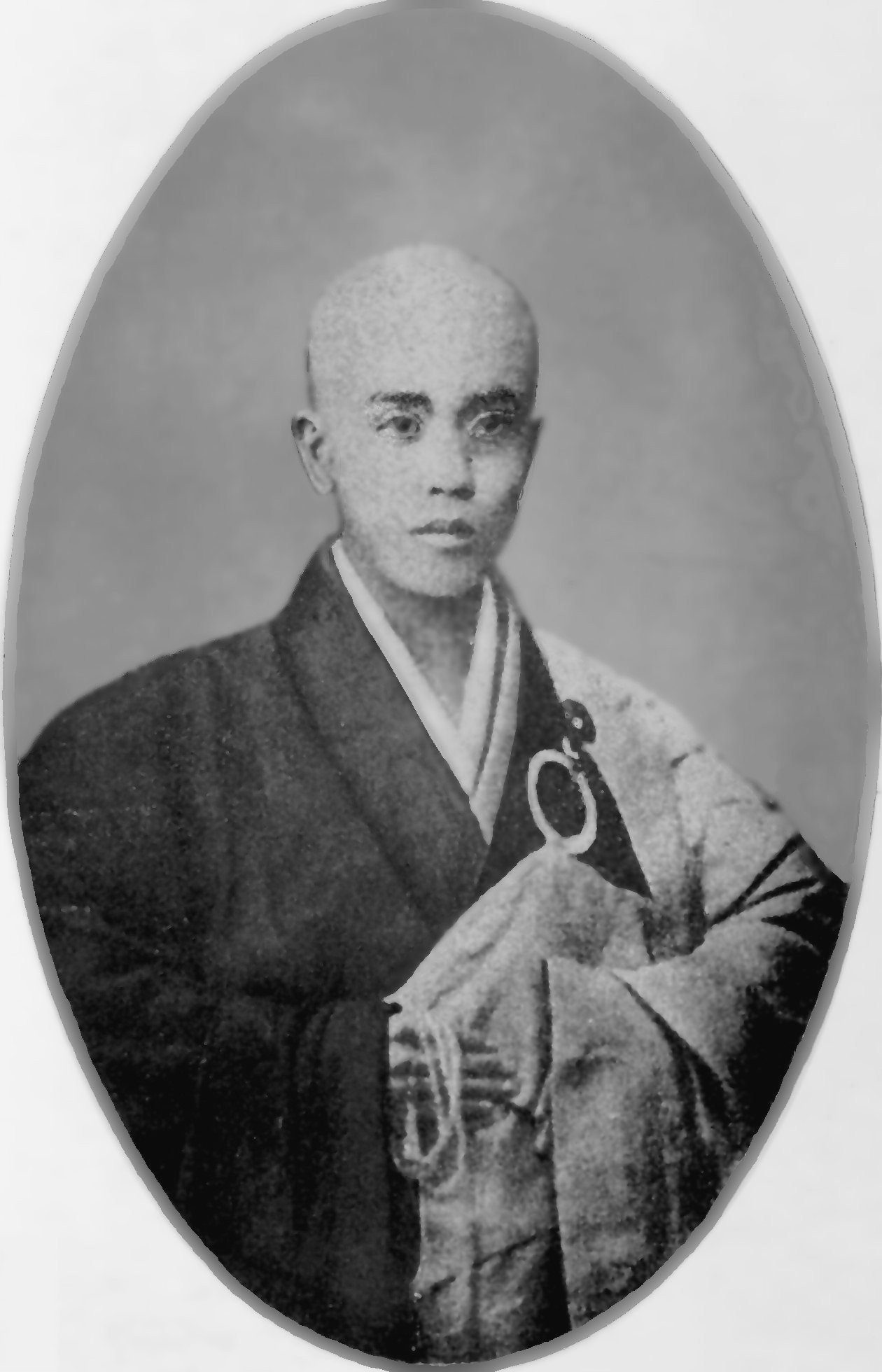
Ekai Kawaguchi just before leaving Japan c. 1891

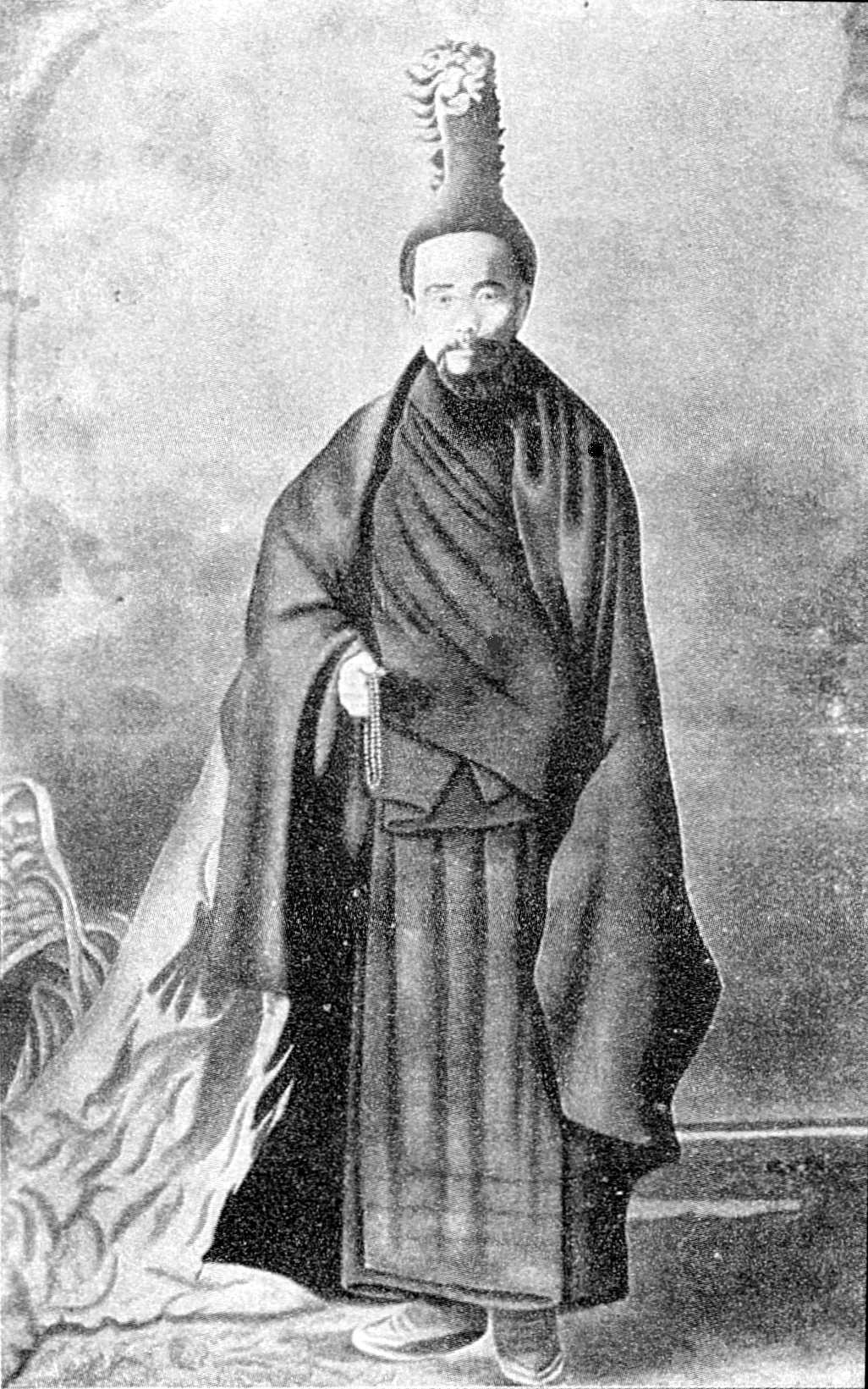
Kawaguchi as Tibetan lama, Darjeeling.

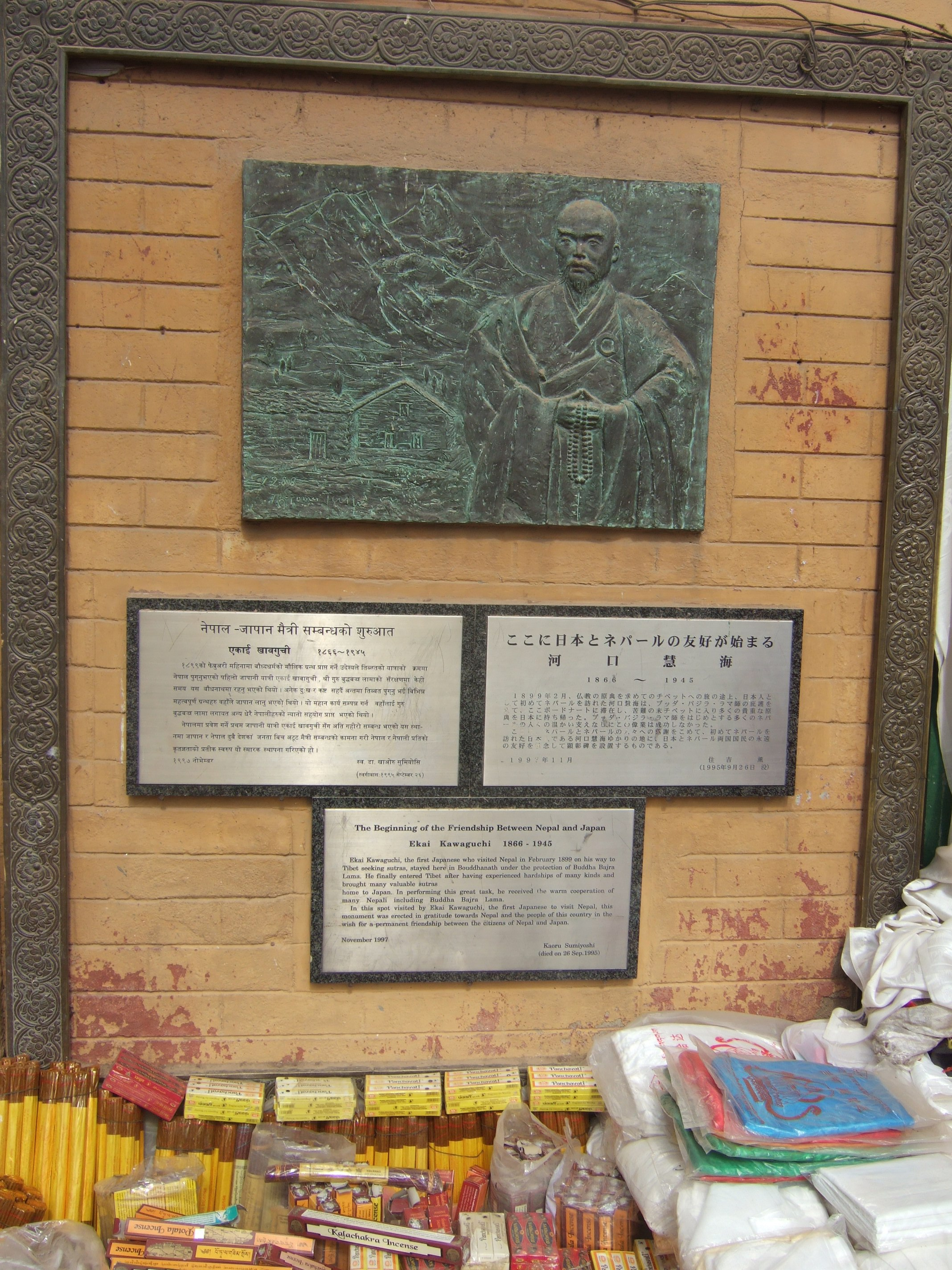
In commemoration of Kawaguchi's visit to Nepal (Bodnath, Kathmandu)

Kawaguchi performing Tibetan ceremonies.

Ekai Kawaguchi (河口慧海, Kawaguchi Ekai) (February 26, 1866 – February 24, 1945) was a Japanese Buddhist monk who was famed for his four journeys to Nepal (in 1899, 1903, 1905 and 1913) and two to Tibet (July 4, 1900–June 15, 1902, 1914–1915). He was the first recorded Japanese citizen to travel to either country.

== Early life and journey ==
From an early age Kawaguchi, whose birth name was Sadajiro, was passionate about becoming a monk. In fact, his passion was unusual in a country that was quickly modernizing. He gave serious attention to the monastic vows of vegetarianism, chastity, and temperance even as other monks were happily abandoning them.

As a result, he became disgusted with the worldliness and political corruption of the Japanese Buddhist world. Until March, 1891, he worked as the Rector of the Zen Gohyaku rakan Monastery (五百羅漢寺, Gohyaku-rakan-ji) in Tokyo (a large temple that contains 500 rakan icons). He then spent about three years as a hermit in Kyoto studying Chinese Buddhist texts and learning Pali, to no use, and he ran into political squabbles even as a hermit. Finding Japanese Buddhism too corrupt, he decided to go to Tibet instead although the region was officially off limits to all foreigners. In fact, unknown to Kawaguchi, Japanese religious scholars had spent most of the 1890s trying to enter Tibet to find rare Buddhist sutras with the backing of large institutions and scholarships, but had invariably failed.

He left Japan for India in June, 1897, without a guide or map, simply buying his way onto a cargo boat. He had a smattering of English but did not know a word of Hindi or Tibetan. Also, he had no money since he had refused the donations of his friends. Instead, he made several fishmonger and butcher friends pledge to give up their professions forever and become vegetarian, he claimed that the good karma would ensure his success. Success appeared far from guaranteed, but arriving in India with very little money, he somehow entered the good graces of Sarat Chandra Das, an Indian British agent and Tibetan scholar, and was given passage to northern India. Kawaguchi would later be accused of spying for Das, but there is no evidence for that, and a close reading of his diary makes it seem quite unlikely. Kawaguchi stayed in Darjeeling for several months and lived with a Tibetan family by Das's arrangement. He became fluent in the Tibetan language, which was then neither systematically taught to foreigners nor compiled, by talking to children and women on the street.

Crossing over the Himalayas on an unpatrolled dirt road with an untrustworthy guide, Kawaguchi soon found himself alone and lost on the Tibetan plateau. He had the good fortune to befriend every wanderer he met in the countryside, including monks, shepherds, and even bandits, but he still took almost four years to reach Lhasa after stopovers at a number of monasteries and a pilgrimage around the sacred Mount Kailash, in western Tibet. He posed as a Chinese monk and gained a reputation as an excellent doctor, which led to him having an audience with the 13th Dalai Lama, Thubten Gyatso (1876 to 1933). He spent some time living in Sera Monastery.

Kawaguchi devoted his entire time in Tibet to Buddhist pilgrimage and study. Although he mastered the difficult terminology of the Classical Tibetan language and was able to pass for a Tibetan, he was surprisingly intolerant of Tibetans' minor violations of monastic laws and of the eating of meat in a country with very little arable farmland. As a result, he did not fit in well in monastic circles but instead found work as a doctor of Chinese and Western medicine. His services were soon in high demand.

Kawaguchi spent his time in Lhasa in disguise and, following a tip that his cover had been blown, had to flee the country hurriedly. He almost petitioned the government to let him stay as an honest and apolitical monk, but the intimations of high-ranking friends convinced him otherwise. Even so, several of the people who had sheltered him were horribly tortured and mutilated. Kawaguchi was deeply concerned for his friends, and despite his ill health and lack of funds, he used all of his connections after he had left the country to petition Nepalese Prime Minister Chandra Shumsher Rana for help. On the Prime Minister's recommendation, the Tibetan government released Kawaguchi's loyal Tibetan friends from jail.

== Reporting in Japan ==
When Kawaguchi finally returned to Japan, he caused a sensation and an instant surge of interest in the distant Tibet. His travelogue, quickly published based on talks he gave, shows his shock at the lack of hygiene by Tibetans, the filth of Tibetan cities, and many Tibetan customs, including sexual practices, monastic immoderation, corruption and superstitious beliefs. On the other hand, he had great admiration for many Tibetans ranging from great religious and political leaders to common people, and he made many friends in Tibet. Ironically given Kawaguchi's faithful background, newspapers criticized his lectures to the public about Tibetan hygiene and sexual practices as being a hodge-podge of lowbrow humor and dirty stories unbecoming of a monk.

Narita Yasuteru, a Japanese spy who was secretly dispatched to Tibet in the late 1890s, anonymously accused Kawaguchi of having never been there, but that accusation was quickly debunked by the Japanese newspapers. In fact, internal documents show that Narita himself had never reached Tibet on his expensive spy mission, which made Kawaguchi the first person who had actually arrived there.

== Further travels ==
Partly as a result of hearing about the discovery of an Ashoka Pillar in 1896 identifying Lumbini as the birthplace of Gautama Buddha, he visited Lumbini with other Japanese pilgrims in 1912. He then returned to Tibet a final time in 1913. While his more mature narrative of that trip was mainly occupied with Japanese poems about the beauty of the land, he could not resist some final criticisms of the monks' lax attitude towards monastic rules. He brought back to Japan a large collection of Tibetan scriptures, but he had a lengthy and public dispute with the other pilgrims about the Dalai Lama's intentions for them, which caused him to lose some face in the Buddhist world. He assisted the German Theravada monk Nyanatiloka in the 1920s.

Kawaguchi then became an independent monk, lived with his brother's family for the rest of his life, and earned an income from scholarly publications. He refused to assist the military police when they sought intelligence on Tibet and died in 1945.

He was a friend of Mrs. Annie Besant, the president of the Theosophical Society, who encouraged him to publish the English text of his book Three Years in Tibet.

The Nepalese government issued a postage stamp in 2003 commemorating Kawaguchi's visits to the country. He is also said to have planted two saplings of Himalayan cicada trees (also called: Riang Riang; Ploiarium alternifolium), which he had brought back with him, near the gate of the Obaku-san Manpukuji Zen Buddhist temple on the outskirts of Kyoto, where he had studied as a young man.

== Buddhist doctrinal reformer ==
Kawaguchi was disturbed by the confusing messages of the main objects of veneration based on a pantheon of deities, spirits, historical and mythological figures. Instead, he called for a return to veneration of Shakyamuni and lay-centered practice.

== Sources ==
- Berry, Scott (1989). A Stranger in Tibet: The Adventures of a Wandering Zen Monk. Tokyo: Kodansha International. Also published as A Stranger in Tibet: Adventures of a Zen Monk by HarperCollins (1990) ISBN 978-0-00-215337-9.
- Chen, Fei (2020). "Buddhisizing the World: Global Imperialism and Kawaguchi Ekai's Travels in Tibet". Journal of Asian History. 54 (1): 131–156. doi:10.13173/jasiahist.54.1.0131. S2CID 226528378.
- Hopkirk, Peter (1997): Trespassers on the Roof of the World: The Secret Exploration of Tibet. Kodansha Globe (Pbk). ISBN 978-1-56836-050-8.
- Kawaguchi, Ekai (1909). Three Years in Tibet. Adyar: The Theosophical Office. Reprint: Book Faith India (1995), Delhi. ISBN 81-7303-036-7.
- Okuyama, Naoji (2008). "The Tibet Fever among Japanese Buddhists of the Meiji Era". In Esposito, Monica (ed.). Images of Tibet in the 19th and 20th centuries. Paris: Ecole française d'Extrême-Orient. ISBN 9782855396583.
- Subedi, Abhi: Ekai Kawaguchi:The Trespassing Insider. Mandala Book Point. Kathmandu, 1999.
