= Buddhism in the West =

Buddhism in the West (or more narrowly Western Buddhism) broadly encompasses the knowledge and practice of Buddhism outside of Asia, in the Western world. Occasional intersections between Western civilization and the Buddhists world have been occurring for thousands of years. Greek colonies existed in India during the Buddha's life, as early as the 6th century. The first Westerners to become Buddhists were Greeks who settled in Bactria and India during the Hellenistic period. They became influential figures during the reigns of the Indo-Greek kings, whose patronage of Buddhism led to the emergence of Greco-Buddhism and Greco-Buddhist art.

There was little contact between the Western and Asian cultures during most of the Middle Ages, but the early modern rise of global trade and mercantilism, improved navigation technology and the European colonization of Asian Buddhist countries led to increased knowledge of Buddhism among Westerners. This increased contact led to various responses from Buddhists and Westerners throughout the modern era. These include religious proselytism, religious polemics and debates (such as the Sri Lankan Panadura debate), Buddhist modernism, Western convert Buddhists and the rise of Buddhist studies in Western academia.

During the 20th century, there was growth in Western Buddhism due to various factors such as immigration, globalization, the decline of Christianity and increased interest among Westerners. The various schools of Buddhism are now established in all major Western countries making up a small minority in the United States (1% in 2024), Europe (0.3% in 2020), as well as in Australia (2.4% in 2016) and New Zealand (1.5% in 2013).

== Premodern history ==
=== Greco-Buddhism ===
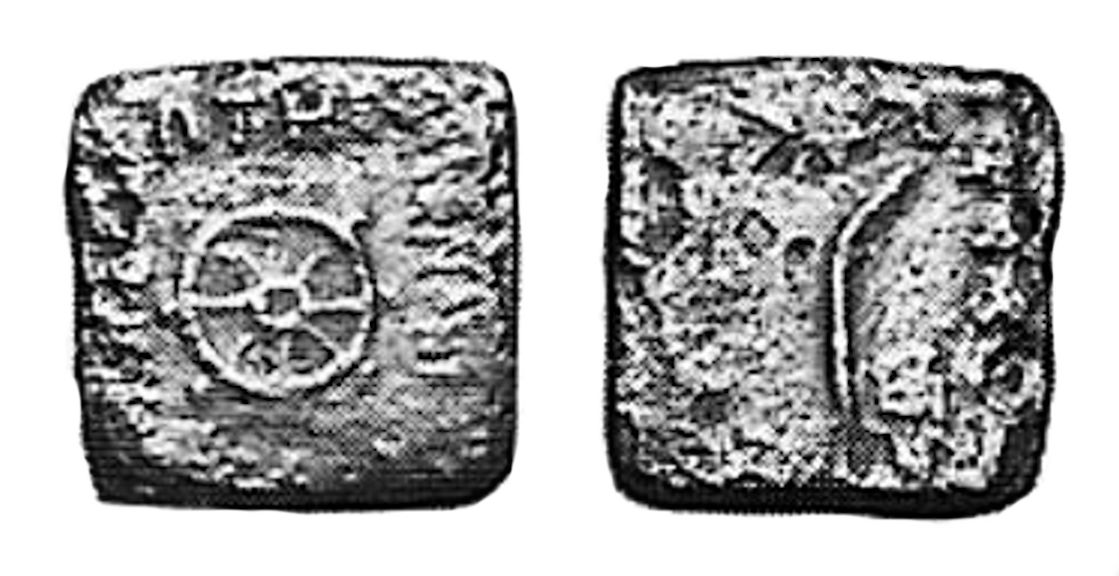
A coin of Menander I (r.160–135 BC) with a dharmacakra and a palm.

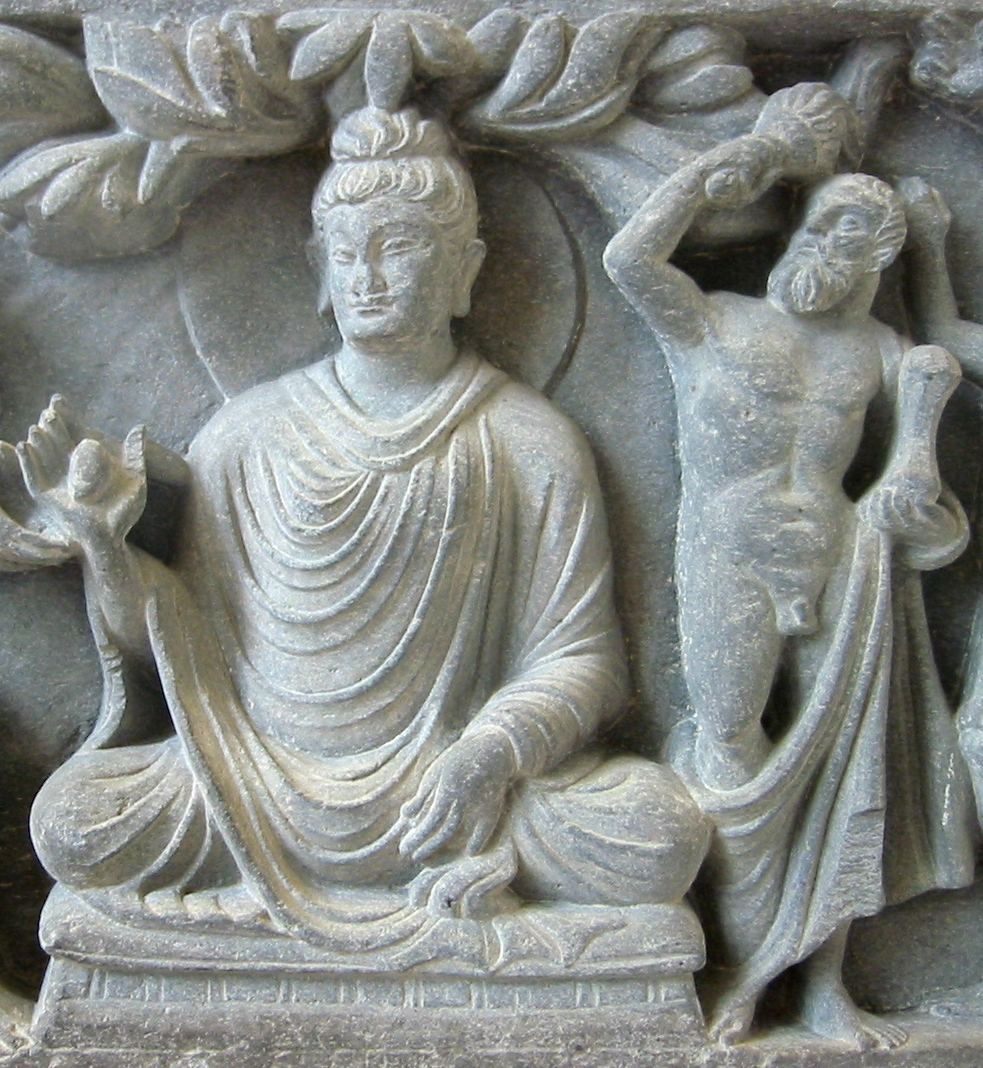
Heracles depiction of Vajrapani as the protector of the Buddha, 2nd century Gandhara, British Museum.

The first contact between Western culture and Buddhist culture occurred during Alexander the Great's Indian campaign.

After Alexander's conquests, Greek colonists established cities and kingdoms in Bactria and the Indian subcontinent where Buddhism was thriving. This cultural interaction saw the emergence of Greco-Buddhism and Greco-Buddhist art, especially within the Gandharan civilization which covered a large part of modern-day northern Pakistan and eastern Afghanistan. Greek sculptors in the classical tradition came to teach their skills to Indian sculptors resulting in the distinctive style of Greco-Buddhist art in stone and stucco seen in hundreds of Buddhist monasteries which are still being discovered and excavated in this region.

Greco-Buddhism was an important religion among the Greco-Bactrians and the Indo-Greeks. The Indo-Greek kings such as Menander I (165/155 –130 BCE) and Menander II (90–85 BCE) used Buddhist symbolism in their coins. Menander I is a main character of the Indian Buddhist scripture known as Milinda Panha ("The Questions of King Milinda"), which states that he adopted the Buddhist religion. The Buddhist tradition considers Menander as a great benefactor of the Dharma, along with Ashoka.

The Mahavamsa mentions that during Menander's reign, a Greek elder monk named Mahadharmaraksita led 30,000 Buddhist monks from "the Greek city of Alexandria" (possibly Alexandria on the Caucasus) to Sri Lanka for the dedication of a stupa showing that Greeks took an active part in Indian Buddhism during this period.

Greco-Buddhist styles continued to be influential during the Kushan Empire.

=== Pyrrhonism ===
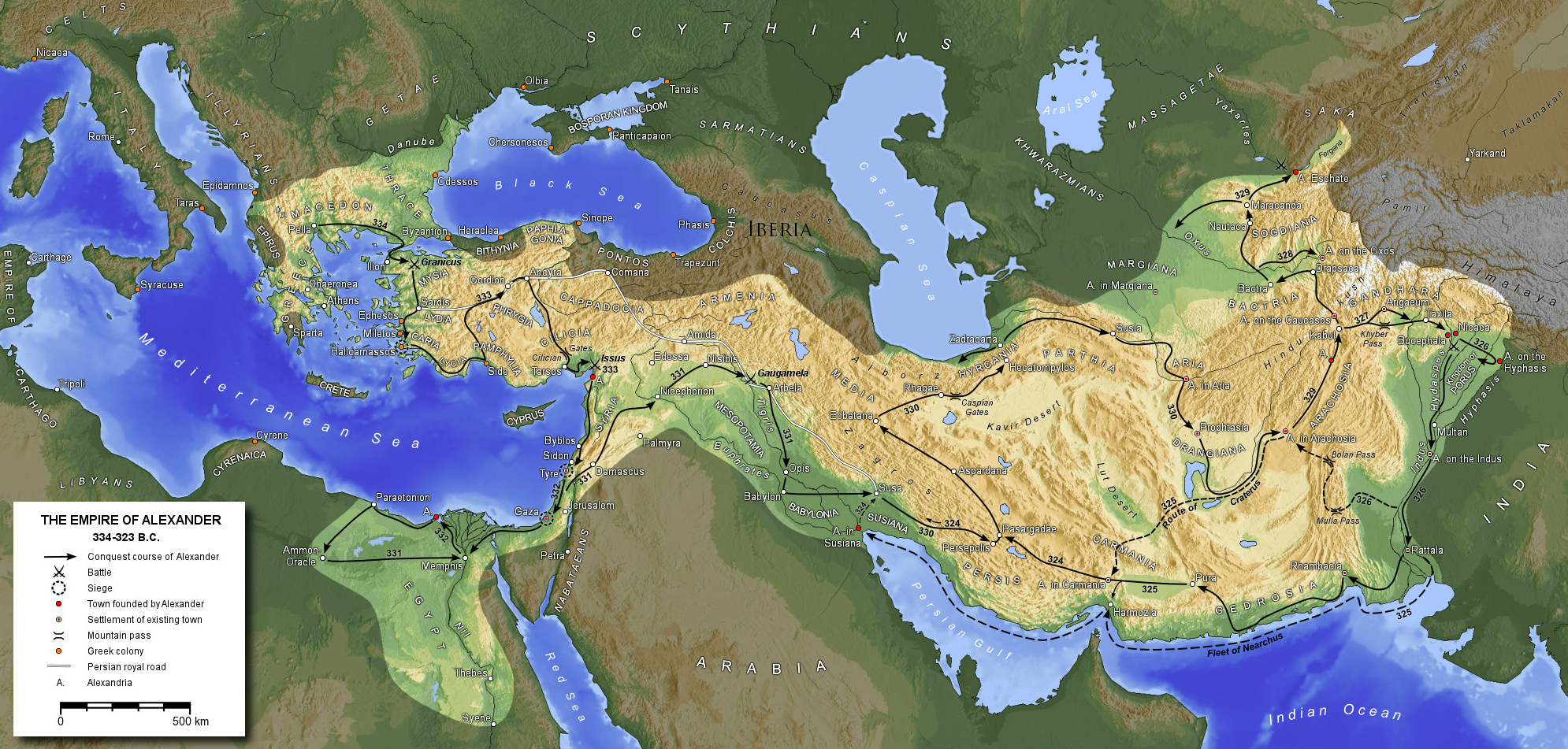
Map of Alexander the Great's empire and the route he and Pyrrho took to India

Alexander the Great's court on his conquest of India included the philosopher Pyrrho who created his philosophy, Pyrrhonism, with influence from the Buddhist three marks of existence.

The Pyrrhonists promote suspending judgment (epoché) about dogma (beliefs about non-evident matters) as the way to reach ataraxia, a soteriological objective similar to nirvana. This is similar to the practices described in the Aṭṭhakavagga, one of the oldest Buddhist texts, and it is similar to the Buddha's refusal to answer certain metaphysical questions which he saw as non-conductive to the path of Buddhist practice and Nagarjuna's "relinquishing of all views (drsti)".

Later Pyrrhonism substantially parallels the teachings of Madhyamaka Buddhism, particularly the surviving works of Sextus Empiricus, Thomas McEvilley and Matthew Neale suspect that Nāgārjuna was influenced by Greek Pyrrhonist texts imported into India.

=== Buddhism and the Roman world ===
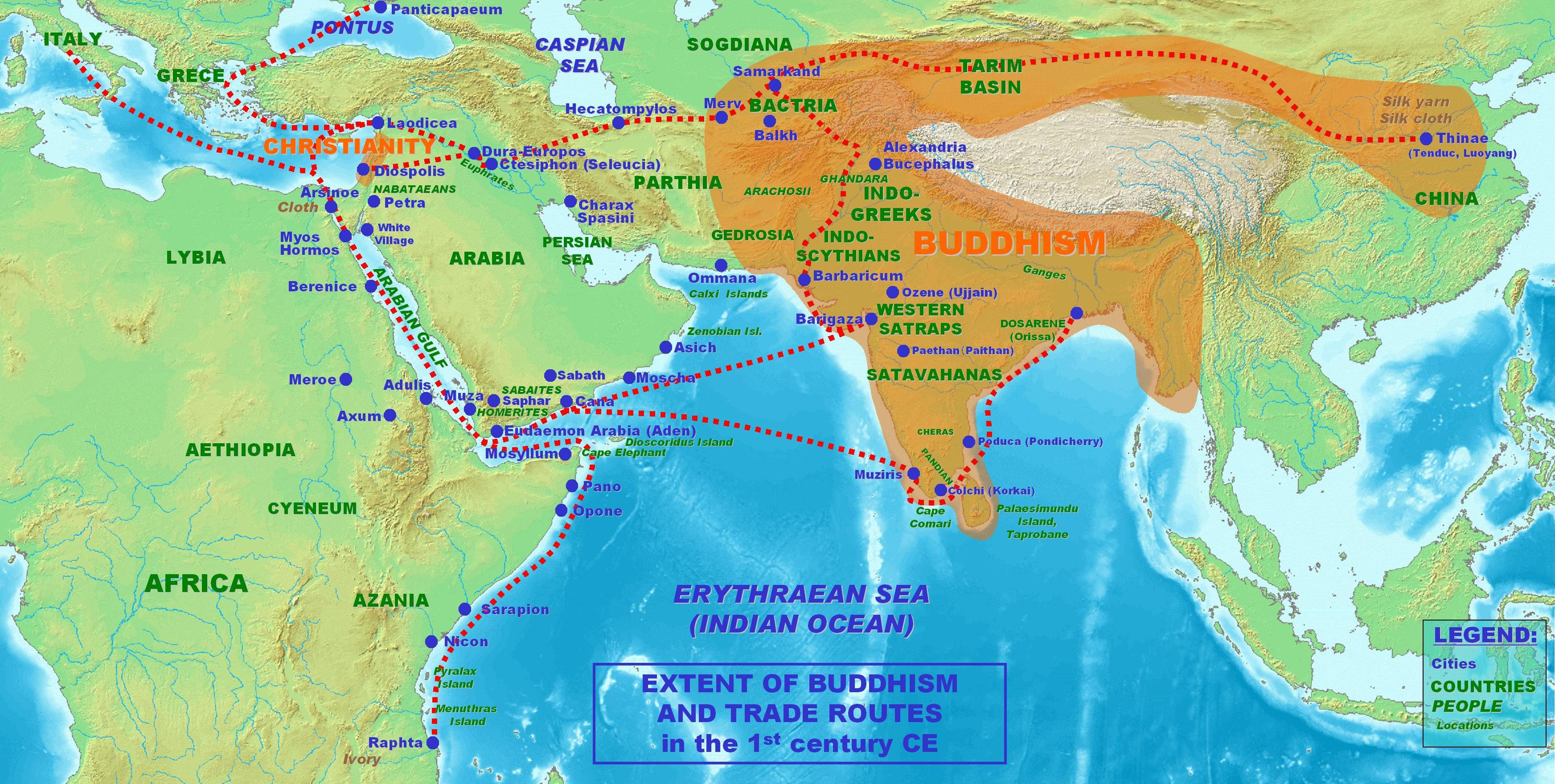
Extent of Buddhism and trade routes in the 1st century AD.

Several instances of interactions between Buddhism and the Roman Empire are documented by Classical and early Christian writers. Roman historical accounts describe an embassy sent by the Indian king Pandion, also known as Porus, to Augustus around 13 CE. The embassy was travelling with a diplomatic letter in Greek, and one of its members—called Zarmanochegas—was an Indian religious man (sramana) who burned himself alive in Athens to demonstrate his faith. The event created a sensation and was described by Nicolaus of Damascus, who met the embassy at Antioch, and related by Strabo (XV,1,73) and Dio Cassius. These accounts at least indicate that religious men from India (Sramanas, to which the Buddhists belonged, as opposed to Hindu Brahmanas) were visiting Mediterranean countries. However, the term sramana is a general term for Indian religious man in Jainism, Buddhism, and Ājīvika. It is not clear which of those religious tradition the man belonged to in this case.

Early 3rd–4th century Christian writers such as Hippolytus and Epiphanius write about a figure called Scythianus, who visited India around 50 CE from where he brought "the doctrine of the Two Principles". According to Cyril of Jerusalem, Scythianus' pupil Terebinthus presented himself as a "Buddha" ("He called himself Buddas") and taught in Palestine, Judaea and Babylon.

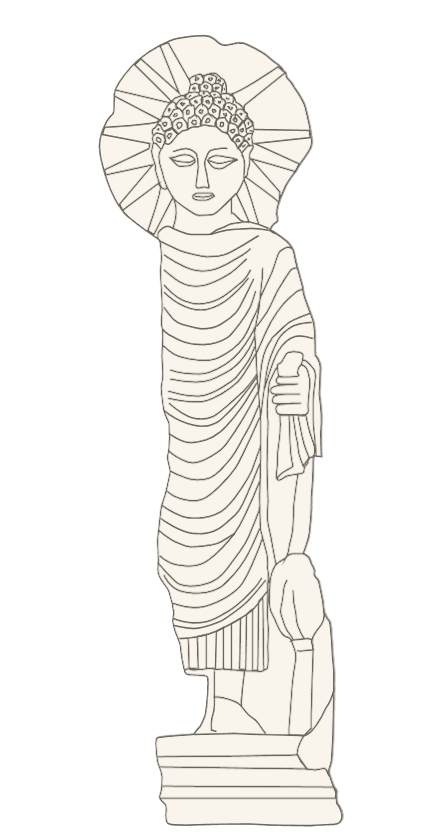
The Berenike Buddha, discovered in Berenice, Egypt, in 2022.

In Berenice, Egypt, in March 2022 an American-Polish archaeological mission excavating the main early Roman period temple dedicated to the Goddess Isis uncovered in the forecourt of the temple a marble statue of a Buddha, the Berenike Buddha.

=== Buddhism and Christianity ===
The influential early Christian church father Clement of Alexandria (died AD 215) mentioned Buddha (Βούττα):

Among the Indians are those philosophers also who follow the precepts of Boutta, whom they honour as a god on account of his extraordinary sanctity.

The myth of the birth of the Buddha was also known: a fragment of Archelaos of Carrha (278 AD) mentions the Buddha's virgin-birth, and Saint Jerome (4th century) mentions the birth of the Buddha, who he says "was born from the side of a virgin".

The legend of Christian saints Barlaam and Josaphat draws on the life of the Buddha.

In the 13th century, international travelers, such as Giovanni de Piano Carpini and William of Ruysbroeck, sent back reports of Buddhism to the West and noted some similarities with Nestorian Christian communities. The famous travel writer Marco Polo (1254–1324) wrote much about Buddhism, its rites and customs, in places such as Khotan, China and Sri Lanka.

== Early modern and colonial encounters ==
When European Christians made more direct contact with Buddhism in the early 16th century, Jesuit missionaries to Asia such as St. Francis Xavier and Ippolito Desideri sent back detailed accounts of Buddhist doctrine and practices. Ippolito Desideri spent a long time in Tibet, learning the Tibetan language and Tibetan Buddhist doctrine before writing an account of his travels and of Tibetan Buddhism. He also wrote several books in Tibetan which promoted Christianity and critiqued Buddhism. Other influential Jesuit writers on Buddhism Alessandro Valignano (1539–1606) and Matteo Ricci (1552–1610). The Portuguese colonial efforts in Sri Lanka during the 16th and 17th centuries saw some of the first large scale direct contact between Buddhists and Westerners. According to Stephen Berkwitz, by the late 17th century, "the existence of a religion across Asia that worshiped images of the Buddha, known and referred to by many different names, was a well-known fact among European scholars."

This recognition that Buddhism was indeed a distinct Asian religion with its own texts and not just a form of local paganism, led Catholic missionaries to see Buddhism as a serious rival to Christianity in Asia and to promote its further study so as to combat it. They also sought to explain how such a religion could exist which appeared to deviate from those originating from divine revelation and yet also contained numerous similarities (monastic orders, virgin birth of its founder, belief in heaven and hell, etc.). Because of this, many Portuguese writers explained the Buddhist religion as a form of Christianity corrupted by the devil and some even said Buddhists were "in league with the devil". Catholic missionaries in Asia especially criticized the Buddhist view of rebirth, "idol worship" and denial of the immortality of the soul or a first cause.

With the arrival of Sanskrit and Oriental studies in European universities in the late 18th century, and the subsequent availability of Buddhist texts, Western Buddhist studies began to take shape. An important early figure is Paulinus a Sancto Bartholomaeo who first remarked on the connection between Sanskrit and Pali, and described an early Italian translation of the Kammavaca in his Systema brahmanicum.

== 19th century ==
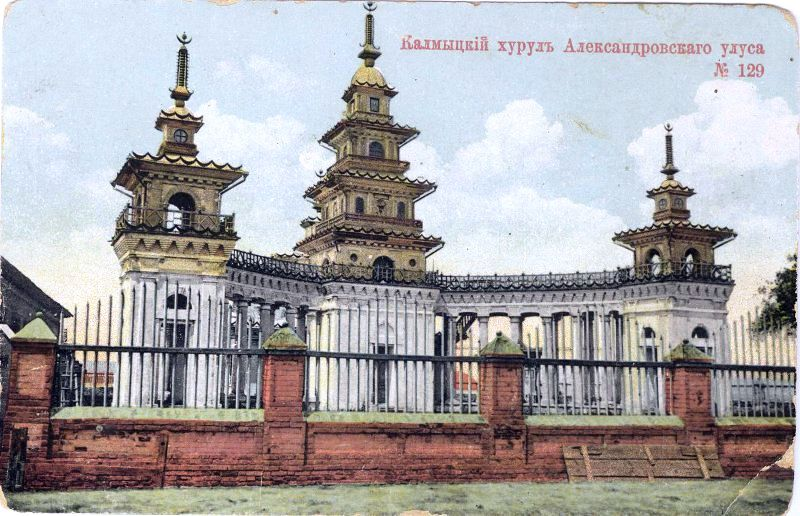
Khosheutovsky khurul - lithograph by an unknown artist from the 1840s

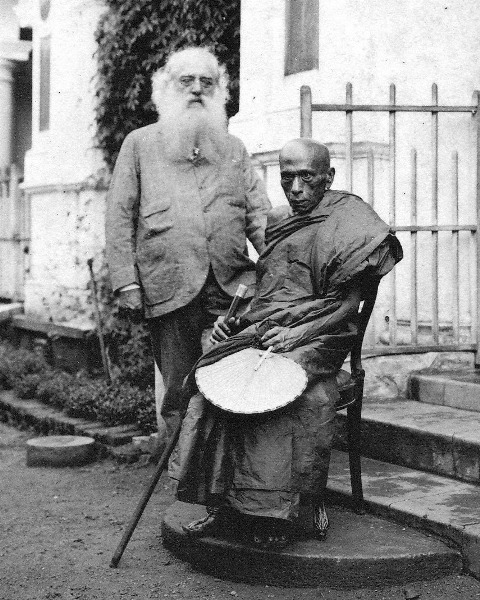
Ven. Hikkaduwe Sri Sumangala Thera and Henry Steel Olcott, the first President of the Theosophical Society, in Colombo, 1889.

During the 19th century, Buddhism (along with other non-European religions and philosophies) came to the attention of Western intellectuals through the work of Christian missionaries, scholars, and imperial civil servants who wrote about the countries in which they worked. Most accounts of Buddhism placed it in a negative light however, as a nihilistic, pessimistic, idolatrous and heathen faith. Jules Barthélemy-Saint-Hilaire for example, described Buddhism as the nihilistic nadir of Indian pessimism.

On October 17-18, 1858, the Khosheutovsky khurul was visited by Alexandre Dumas, who was staying with Serebdzhab Tyumen at that time.

One early and influential sympathetic account was Sir Edwin Arnold's book-length poem The Light of Asia (1879), a life of the Buddha which became an influential best-seller. The book, coming at a time when Christianity was being challenged by critical Biblical scholarship and Darwinism, was seen by some Western intellectuals as promoting a more rational alternative to Christianity. This book eventually went through eighty editions and sold between half a million to a million copies.

The growth of Spiritualism and Theosophy also contributed to the rise of interest in Buddhism. Some Theosophists actually converted to Buddhism, such as Helena Blavatsky and Henry Steel Olcott who according to Stephen Prothero were "the first European-Americans to publicly and formally become lay Buddhists" in 1880. Olcott became a very influential figure in the Sinhalese Buddhist revival and in promoting the rise of a modernist Buddhism. He founded various branches of the Buddhist Theosophical Society in his first visit to Sri Lanka and wrote Buddhist educational literature. Seeing himself as an educator who was attempting to help the Sinhalese understand "real" Buddhism (based on a rational academic study of the Pali texts, not on "debased, sectarian, and creedal" local forms), he wrote an influential introduction to Buddhism called the Buddhist Catechism (1881), which proved extremely popular and remains in use today. While Olcott's Buddhism was influenced by liberal Protestantism as well as Theosophical ideas, Sinhalese Buddhists such as the famous Hikkaduve Sumangala supported his efforts and he became very popular in the island.

The writings of Lafcadio Hearn were also influential in introducing Japanese Buddhism to Western audiences.

=== In Europe ===
The 19th century also saw the growth of the first thorough academic studies, publications and translations of Buddhist texts. The work of the French orientalist Eugène Burnouf is some of the first academic work on Buddhism which includes a French translation of the Lotus sutra from Sanskrit. He laid the foundation for the study of Sanskrit Buddhist texts. He and Christian Lassen also published an early Pali grammar in 1826. Benjamin Clough, a Wesleyan missionary, also published an early grammar of the language in Colombo, 1824, A compendious Pali grammar with a copious vocabulary in the same language. The first Pali dictionary was published in 1875, Robert Caesar Childers' A Dictionary of the Pali language. The work of Emile Senart is also important, and includes a publication and study of the Sanskrit Mahavastu as well as his Essai sur la légende du Bouddha, which interpreted the Buddha as a solar deity figure.

1881 was a seminal year for the new field now known as Buddhist studies. The Pali Text Society was founded in 1881 by Thomas William Rhys Davids, who was an influential early translator of the Buddhist Pali Canon. Another influential scholar in the field was the Indologist Max Müller, who edited Buddhist texts which were published in the Oxford series known as Sacred Books of the East. In 1881, Volume 10 included the first translations of the Dhammapada (Müller) and the Sutta-Nipata (Viggo Fausböll). Hermann Oldenberg's 1881 study on Buddhism, entitled Buddha: his life, his doctrine, his order (Buddha: Sein Leben, seine Lehre, seine Gemeinde), based on Pāli texts was also an early influential work which critiqued the solar myth theory.

This era also saw Western philosophers taking note of Buddhism. These included the influential German philosopher Arthur Schopenhauer, who read about Buddhism and other Indian religions, and praised their way of life in his works as the highest ideal. Schopenhauer later claimed that Buddhism was the "best of all possible religions." Schopenhauer's view of human suffering as arising from striving or Will and his compassion-based ethics have been compared to Buddhism. Religion scholars specialized in the academic study of Western esotericism recognize that Theravada Buddhism had been influential on the philosophical and religious thought of the English occultist and ceremonial magician Aleister Crowley, although he eventually distanced himself from Theravada Buddhist teachings and founded his own religion.

There are frequent mentions of Buddhism in the work of the German philosopher Friedrich Nietzsche, who praised Buddhism in his 1895 work The Anti-Christ, calling it "a hundred times more realistic than Christianity" because it is atheistic, phenomenalistic, and anti-metaphysical. Nietzsche wrote that "Buddhism already has—and this distinguishes it profoundly from Christianity—the self-deception of moral concepts behind it—it stands, in my language, Beyond Good and Evil." However, he also saw Buddhism as a kind of life-denying nihilistic religion. Thus, even though Nietzsche saw himself as undertaking a similar project to the Buddha, writing in 1883, "I could become the Buddha of Europe"; he saw himself as consciously anti-Buddhist, further writing "though frankly I would be the antipode of the Indian Buddha." Robert Morrison believes that there is "a deep resonance between them" as "both emphasise the centrality of humans in a godless cosmos and neither looks to any external being or power for their respective solutions to the problem of existence".

=== In North America ===
The first Buddhists to arrive in North America were Chinese immigrants to the West Coast in the 1848 Gold Rush. By 1875 there were 8 temples in San Francisco and many more smaller ones along the West Coast. They practiced a mixture of "Confucian ancestor veneration, popular Taoism, and Pure Land Buddhism." At about the same time, immigrants from Japan began to arrive as laborers on Hawaiian plantations and central-California farms. In 1893 the first Jōdo Shinshū priests arrived in San Francisco, and they formally established the Buddhist Missions of North America, later renamed the Buddhist Churches of America in 1899. The BCA is the oldest major institutional form of Buddhism in the United States. This organization acted as way for immigrants to preserve their Japanese culture and language, as well as their religion.

Asian immigrants also arrived in British Columbia, Canada during the 1850s (to work as miners), and the old immigrant population was bolstered by new influx of Asian migrants after the 1962 Immigration Act and also as a result of the arrival of refugees from Indochina. Mining work also led Chinese immigrants to Australia (in 1848) and New Zealand (1863). American Transcendentalist thinkers were interested in Eastern religions, including Buddhism, though they were never converts. Ralph Waldo Emerson regarded Hinduism and Buddhism as anticipations of an ideal Transcendentalism. Meanwhile, Henry David Thoreau translated the Lotus Sutra from French into English.

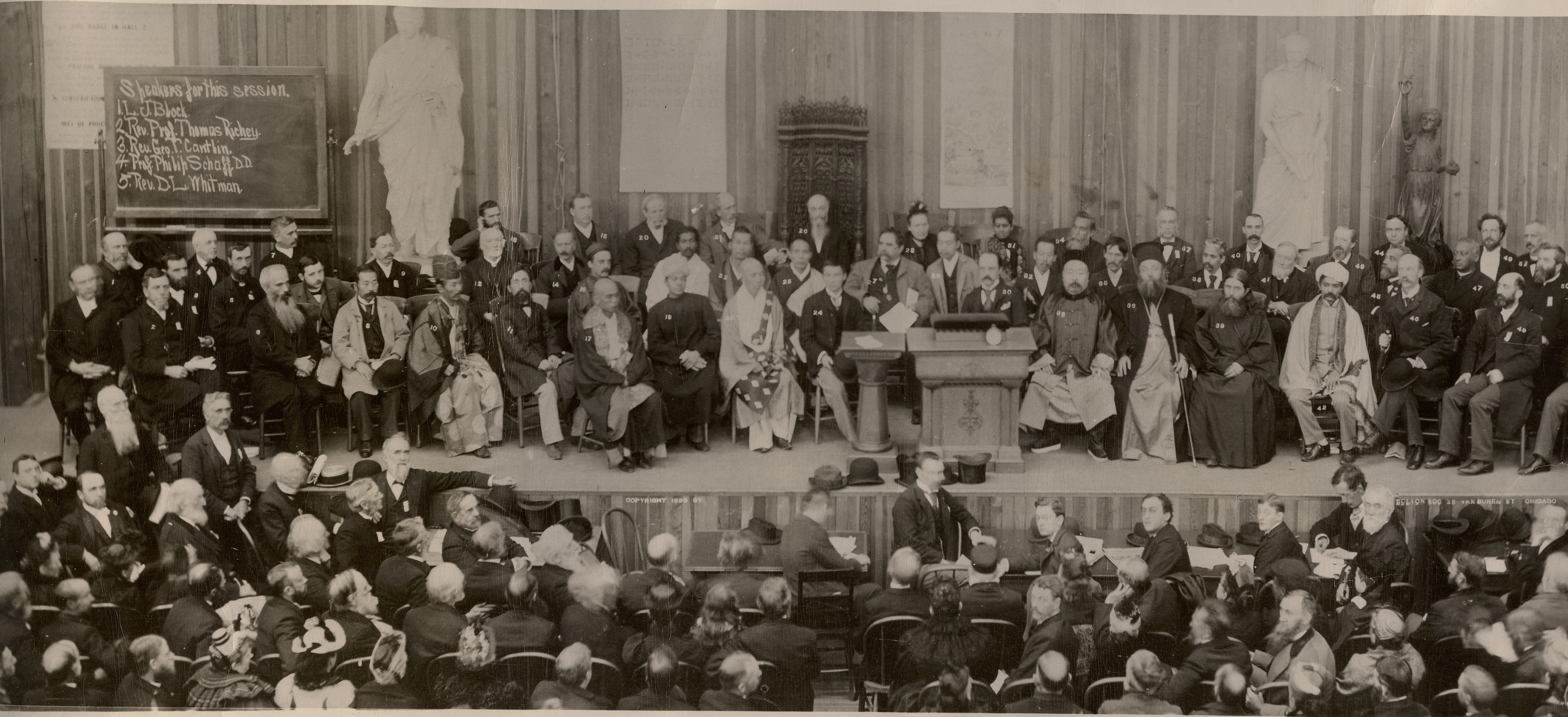
1893 World Parliament of Religions in Chicago

An important event in the history of Western Buddhism was the 1893 World Parliament of Religions in Chicago organized by John Henry Barrows and Paul Carus. The Japanese delegation included the priest Soyen Shaku, the layman Zenshiro Nogushi, four priests and two laymen, representing the Rinzai Zen, Jodo Shinshu, Nichiren, Tendai, and Shingon schools of Japanese Buddhism. The Sri Lankan Anagarika Dharmapala was also present and gave a speech promoting Buddhism. He spoke English with a passion which stirred the audience and drew much attention. He would later come back to the United States for a speaking tour across the nation at the behest of Paul Carus, professor of philosophy, and officiated the first Vesak celebration in San Francisco (1897). On his third visit to North America, he attended a lecture by William James, who gave up his spot to Dharmapala. After Dharmapala finished speaking on Buddhist psychology, James is recorded to have said "this is the psychology everybody will be studying twenty-five years from now."

In 1897, the Japanese Zen philosopher D. T. Suzuki came to the United States to work and study with Paul Carus. Suzuki was the single-most important person in popularizing Zen Buddhism in the West. However, his philosophical thought and understanding of Buddhism were also influenced by Western esoteric traditions such as Theosophy and Swedenborgianism. Suzuki's writings had a strong impact on Western thinkers and intellectuals such as psychologists Erich Fromm and Karen Horney, poets like Allen Ginsberg and Jack Kerouac, as well as on other figures like Alan Watts and Edward Conze. Through his writings, Suzuki contributed to the emergence of a Zen modernism which blends Asian Buddhism with Transcendentalism and Romanticism.

=== Buddhist modernism ===
The works of the early important figures in Western Buddhism such as Henry Olcott, Paul Carus and Soyen Shaku promoted a kind of Buddhism that has been called by contemporary scholars "Buddhist modernism" and also "protestant Buddhism." This new Buddhist discourse included various elements, but especially important was the idea that Buddhism was compatible with modern science and enlightenment rationalism. Olcott's Buddhist catechism is one example, which has a section devoted to Buddhism and science, which promotes the theory of evolution and affirms that Buddhism is based on the consistent operations of causality. He also argues that Buddhists are "earnestly enjoined to accept nothing on faith" and are required to believe only that which is "corroborated by our own reason and consciousness." Paul Carus' encounter with Buddhism led him to believe that it was a great example of a "Religion of Science" and he became an enthusiastic supporter of it because he believed that it was the religion that "recognizes no other revelation except the truth that can be proved by science". His influential work, The Gospel of Buddhism, became quite popular and was translated in various languages. This kind of modernism was also promoted by Asian Buddhists in Asian countries, such as Anagarika Dharmapala.

The rational interpretation of Buddhism as the "religion of reason" was also promoted by early Buddhist societies in Europe, such as the Society for the Buddhist Mission in Leipzig, Germany, founded in 1903 by the Indologist Karl Seidenstücker (1876 –1936) and the British Buddhist Society, in their journal The Buddhist Review.

According to Heinz Bechert, Buddhist modernism includes the following elements: new interpretations of early Buddhist teachings, demythologisation and reinterpretation of Buddhism as "scientific religion", social philosophy or "philosophy of optimism", emphasis on equality and democracy, "activism" and social engagement, support of Buddhist nationalism, and the revival of meditation practice.

== Early 20th century ==
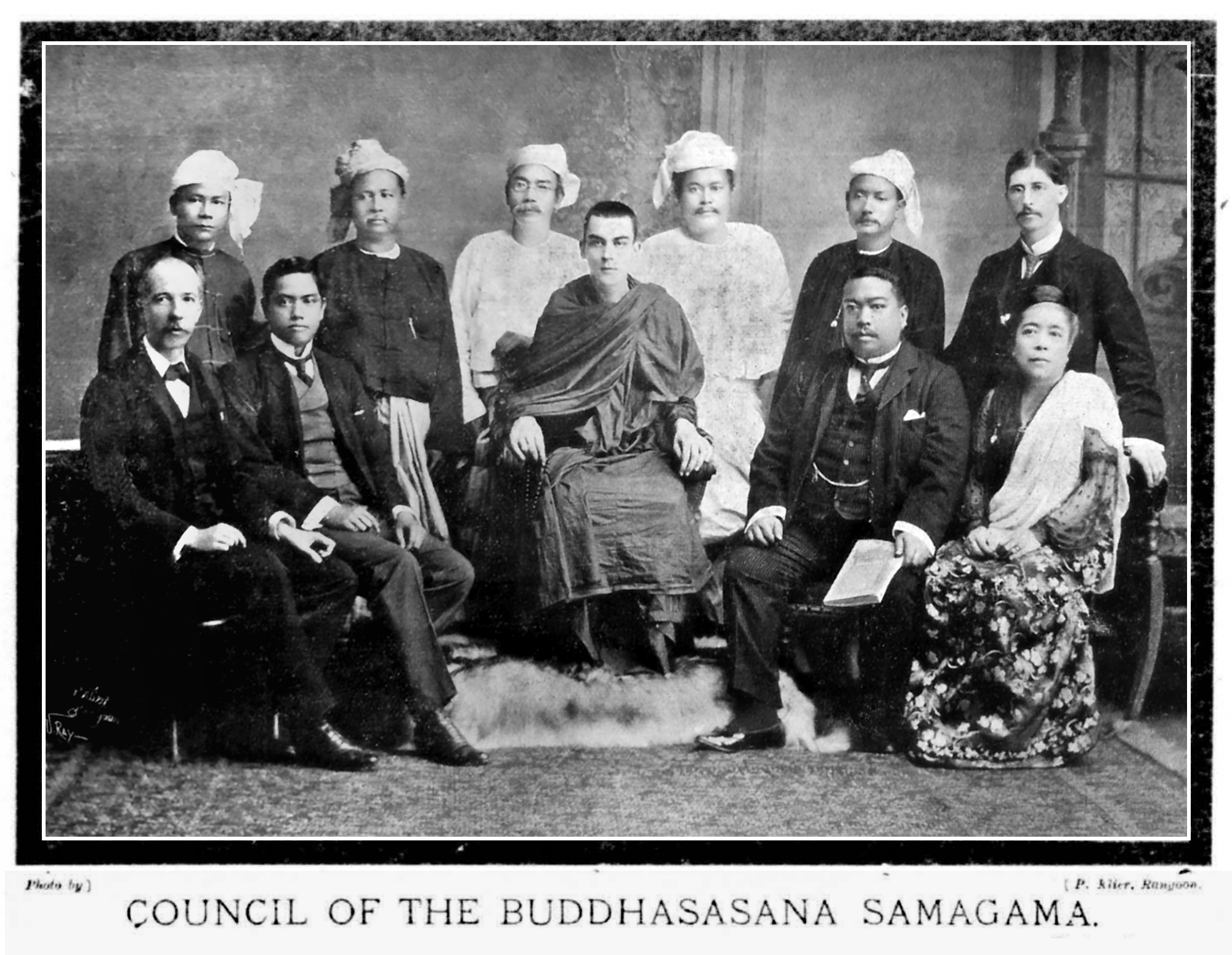
Council of the Buddhasāsana Samāgam (International Buddhist Society), March 1904

The 20th century saw influential Western converts such as the Irish ex-hobo U Dhammaloka and intellectuals such as Bhikkhu Asoka (H. Gordon Douglas), and Ananda Metteyya. U Dhammaloka became a popular traveling Buddhist preacher in Burma in the early 1900s, writing tracts and confronting Christian missionaries. In 1907 he founded the Buddhist Tract Society in Rangoon to distribute pro Buddhist texts as well as other works such as Thomas Paine's Rights of Man and Age of Reason. Another influential figure was Charles Henry Allan Bennett (later Ananda Metteyya), who established the first Buddhist Mission in the United Kingdom, the International Buddhist Society and worked on a periodical called Buddhism: An Illustrated Review as well as two books on Buddhism (The Wisdom of the Aryas and The Religion of Burma).

Throughout the 20th century, the Pali text society continued to be an influential publisher of Buddhist texts, by 1930 all the five Pali Nikayas had been published by the society (and numerous translations were also published). Buddhist studies also made numerous strides during the 20th century, headed by European academies and seen as comprising three "schools" during this period. Important figures include the scholars of the "Franco-Belgian school", such as Louis de La Vallée-Poussin and his student Étienne Lamotte, the Pali-based Anglo-German school which included figures such as Wilhelm Geiger and Caroline Rhys Davids and the "Leningrad school" of Fyodor Shcherbatskoy and Sergey Oldenburg.

Various Western converts during this period became influential figures through their Theravada Buddhist translations and writings, including the German monk Nyanatiloka Thera who founded the Island Hermitage in Sri Lanka and translated many important Pali texts into German. His disciple, the elder Nyanaponika, was a co-founder and president of the Buddhist Publication Society and author of the influential book on meditation, The Heart of Buddhist Meditation. The English Ñāṇamoli Bhikkhu was another influential author associated with the Island Hermitage, known for his numerous translations of Pali texts into English. In 1954, Nyanatiloka and Nyanaponika were the only two Western-born monks invited to participate in the Sixth Buddhist council in Yangon, Burma. Nyanaponika read out Nyanatiloka's message at the opening of the council.

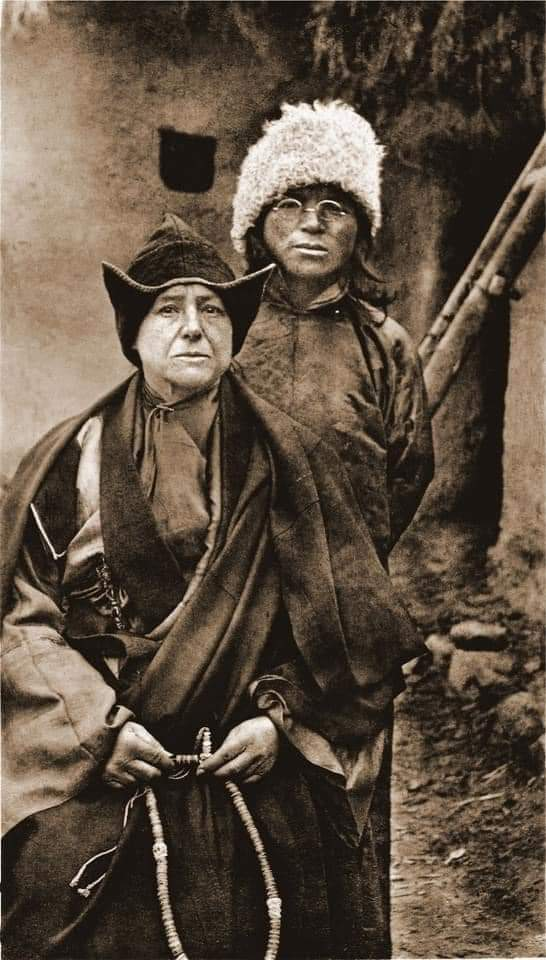
Alexandra David-Néel and Lama Aphur Yongden

During the 20th century, there was an exponential increase in publications on Buddhism. The first English translation of the Tibetan Book of the Dead was published in 1927, by Walter Evans-Wentz. He credited himself as the compiler and editor of these volumes, with translation by Tibetan Buddhists, primarily Lama Kazi Dawa-Samdup. The reprint of 1935 carried a commentary from Carl Jung. The book is said to have attracted many westerners to Tibetan Buddhism. Also published in English in 1927, Alexandra David-Néel's "My Journey to Lhasa" helped popularized the modern perception of Tibet and Tibetan Buddhism at large. During the 20th century the German writer Hermann Hesse showed great interest in Eastern religions, writing a popular book entitled Siddhartha.

=== In Europe ===
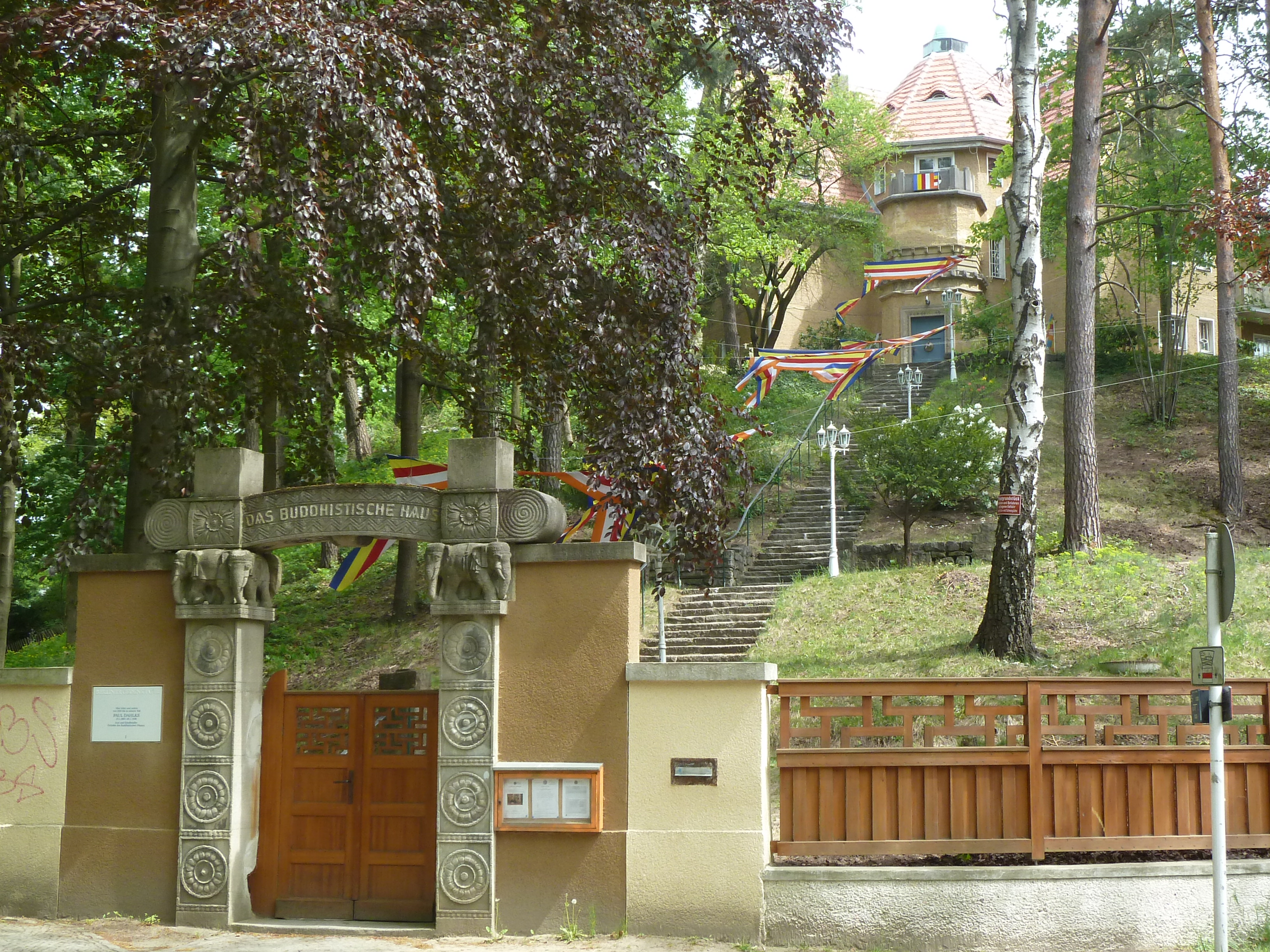
Das Buddhistische Haus, a Theravada Buddhist vihara in Berlin, Germany completed in 1924. It is considered the oldest Theravada Buddhist center in Europe.

The Buddhist Society, London (originally known as the Buddhist Lodge) was founded by Theosophist and convert to Buddhism Christmas Humphreys in 1924. Anagarika Dharmapala also brought his Maha Bodhi Society to England in 1925.

Some of the earliest European institutions were also founded in Germany. In 1921, Georg Grimm (1868 –1945) joined Karl Seidenstücker in founding the Buddhist Parish for Germany in Munich. In 1924, Das Buddhistische Haus, was founded by Paul Dahlke in Berlin. Dahlke had studied Buddhism in Sri Lanka prior to World War I. Meanwhile, in France, Grace Constant Lounsbery founded a Paris-based group called Les amis du Bouddhisme in 1929 who published a journal, La pensée bouddhique.

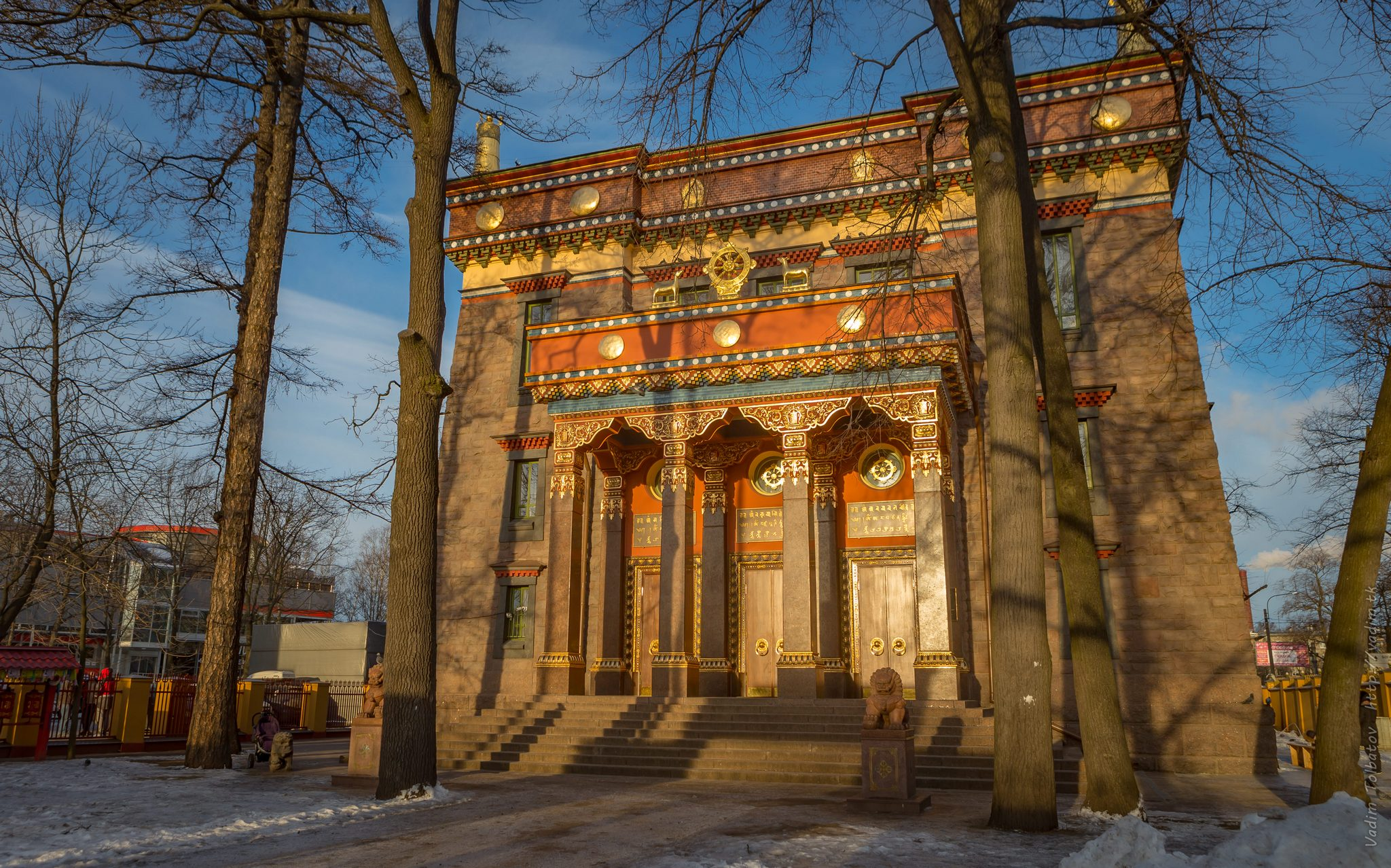
Datsan Gunzechoinei in St. Petersburg, the first Buddhist monastery in Europe

The first Buddhist monastery in Europe was not founded by European converts however, but by Buryat and Kalmyk Buddhists of the Tibetan Gelug school led by Agvan Dorzhiev, who founded a temple in Saint Petersburg in 1909–1915, Datsan Gunzechoinei. This temple was desecrated during the Russian Revolution however, but survived the Second World War and is now active.

=== In North America ===
In the United States, Japanese Americans founded the Bukkyo Seinen Kai, a Young Men's Buddhist Association (YMBA) inspired by Christian institutions. This community had to deal with intense anti-Japanese sentiment during WW2 despite formal statements of loyalty issued by the organization. Many Japanese American Buddhists had to hide their family altars. The Japanese internment during the war accelerated Anglicization, because they were required to use English in the camps. There is also a generation gap in this community between the older immigrant generation and the American born Anglicized generation.

=== In Latin America ===
As a result of similar patterns of Asian immigration, globalization and Western conversion, Buddhism also became an established minority religion in Latin America in the 20th century, with adherents mostly common from the educated middle classes. Japanese immigrants arrived in Latin America at the end of the 19th century and throughout the 20th century. With the largest population in Latin America, Brazil is also home to the most Buddhists (around 230,000) in Latin America and thus plays a central administrative and spiritual role for Buddhism in the rest of South America. It was first introduced by Japanese immigrants in 1908. Rev. Tomojiro Ibaragi of the Honmon Butsuryū-shū founded the first official Buddhist institution in the country in 1936, the Taisseji Temple.

== Post-war developments ==
After the Second World War, mainstream Western Buddhisms began to take shape, influenced by new Western writers on Buddhist thought and a new wave of immigration from Asian Buddhist countries. There was a dramatic rate of growth during the late 20th century. The Complete Guide to Buddhist America for example, listed more than one thousand meditation centers as of 1997 in comparison to the twenty-one centers founded between 1900 and the early 1960s.

Those Westerners disaffected with the materialistic values of consumer culture and traditional Christianity (such as the Beat Generation and later the hippies), as well as those interested a more sober altered state of consciousness or psychedelic experience, were drawn to eastern religions like Buddhism during this period (this is known as the "Zen boom"). Influential literary figures include the American writers Jack Kerouac (The Dharma Bums and The Scripture of the Golden Eternity) and Gary Snyder as well as the British writer Alan Watts (The Way of Zen). The steady influx of refugees from Tibet in the 1960s and from Vietnam, Laos, and Cambodia in the 1970s led to renewed interest in Buddhism, and the countercultural movements of the 1960s proved fertile ground for its Westward diffusion. Buddhism supposedly promised a more methodical path to happiness than Christianity and a way out of the perceived spiritual bankruptcy and complexity of Western life.

=== East Asian Buddhism ===
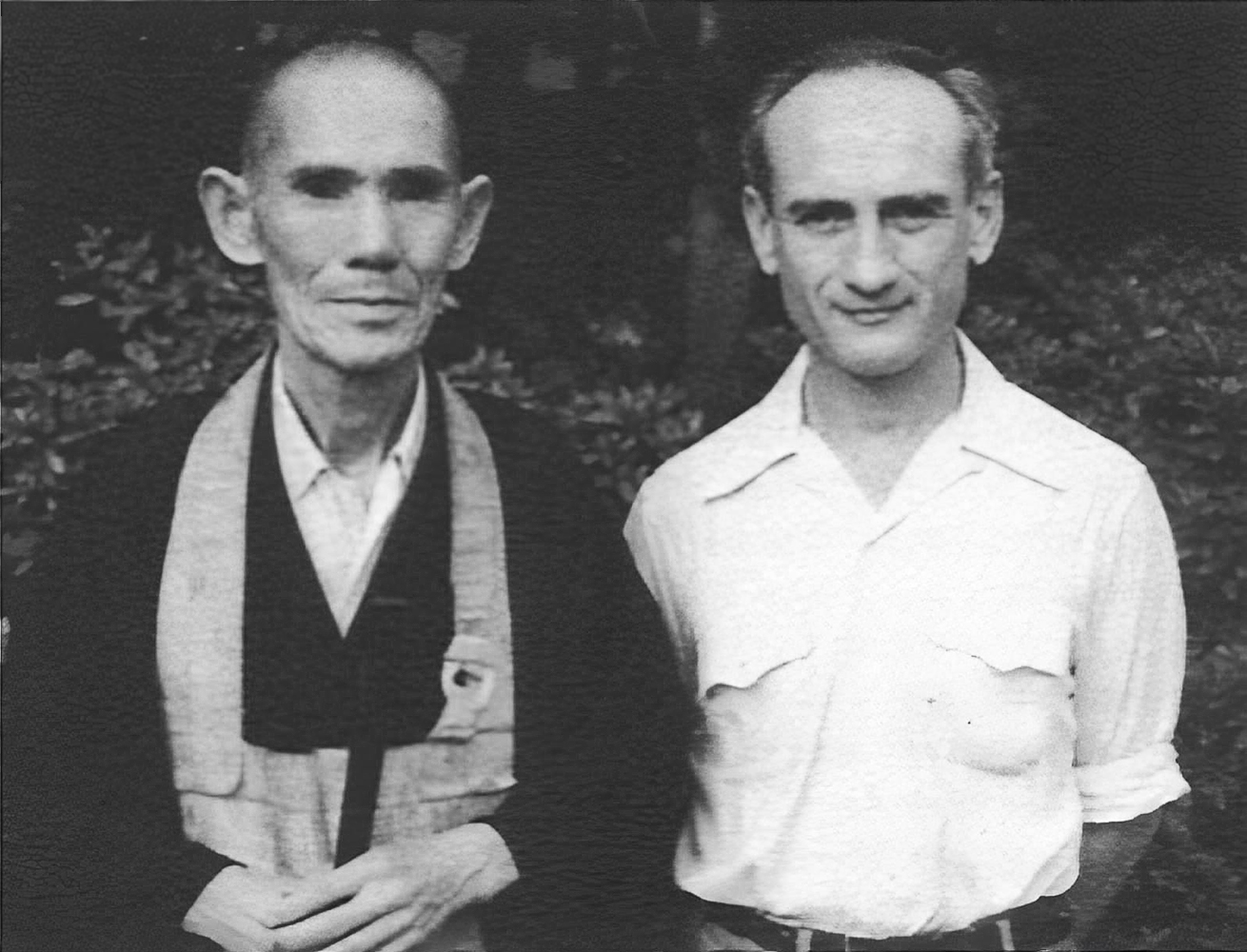
Hakuun Yasutani and Phillip Kapleau

An influential figure is the reformer Hakuun Yasutani, who founded his own school called Sanbo Kyodan in 1954. Many of his reforms, while controversial in Japan, became de rigueur for Western Zen. These reforms focused on laypersons, who were given teachings and care that was traditionally reserved for monastics, the use of intense lay meditation retreats, and a minimizing of ceremony. Influential students of his are Philip Kapleau, Toni Packer and Robert Aitken. Philip Kapleau founded the Rochester Zen Center in New York in 1965. At this time, there were few if any American citizens that had trained in Japan with ordained Buddhist teachers. Kapleau wrote his seminal work The Three Pillars of Zen in 1965, which addressed the actual practice of Zen and the experiences which result. Brigitte D'Ortschy, also a student of Yasutani, translated The Three Pillars of Zen and other Buddhist texts into German and became one of the first Zen teachers in Europe. Robert Aitken, known as the "dean of American Zen", founded Diamond Sangha in Hawaii in 1959 which has grown into a network of affiliated centers and he also translated numerous Zen texts. He also founded the Buddhist Peace Fellowship along with Beat poet Gary Snyder and Joanna Macy.

In 1959, a Japanese teacher, Shunryu Suzuki, arrived in San Francisco. At the time of Suzuki's arrival, Zen had become a hot topic among some groups in the United States, especially beatniks. Suzuki's classes were filled with those wanting to learn more about Buddhism, and the presence of a Zen master inspired the students. Shunryu Suzuki's Zen Mind, Beginner's Mind (1970), quickly became one of America's Buddhist classics. He founded the San Francisco Zen Center during the middle of the 60s counterculture (1962).

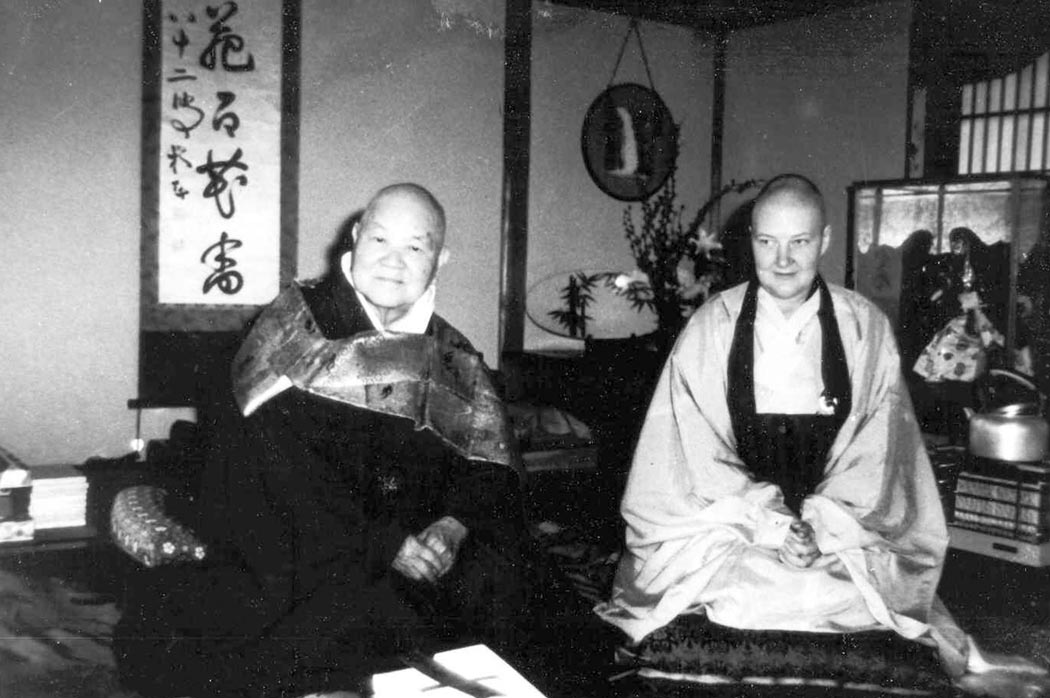
Jiyu-Kennett with her teacher Keido Chisan Koho Zenji

In 1969, Jiyu Kennett, the first woman to study at Sōji-ji Temple since the 14th century, founded Shasta Abbey in California and was known for setting traditional Buddhist texts to Gregorian chant. Austrian-born Myokyo-ni trained at the Rinzai Daitoku-ji temple in Japan during the 1960s and went on to become head of the Zen Centre in London. The German Jesuit priest Hugo Enomiya-Lassalle became one of the foremost teachers to embrace Zen alongside Roman Catholic Christianity.

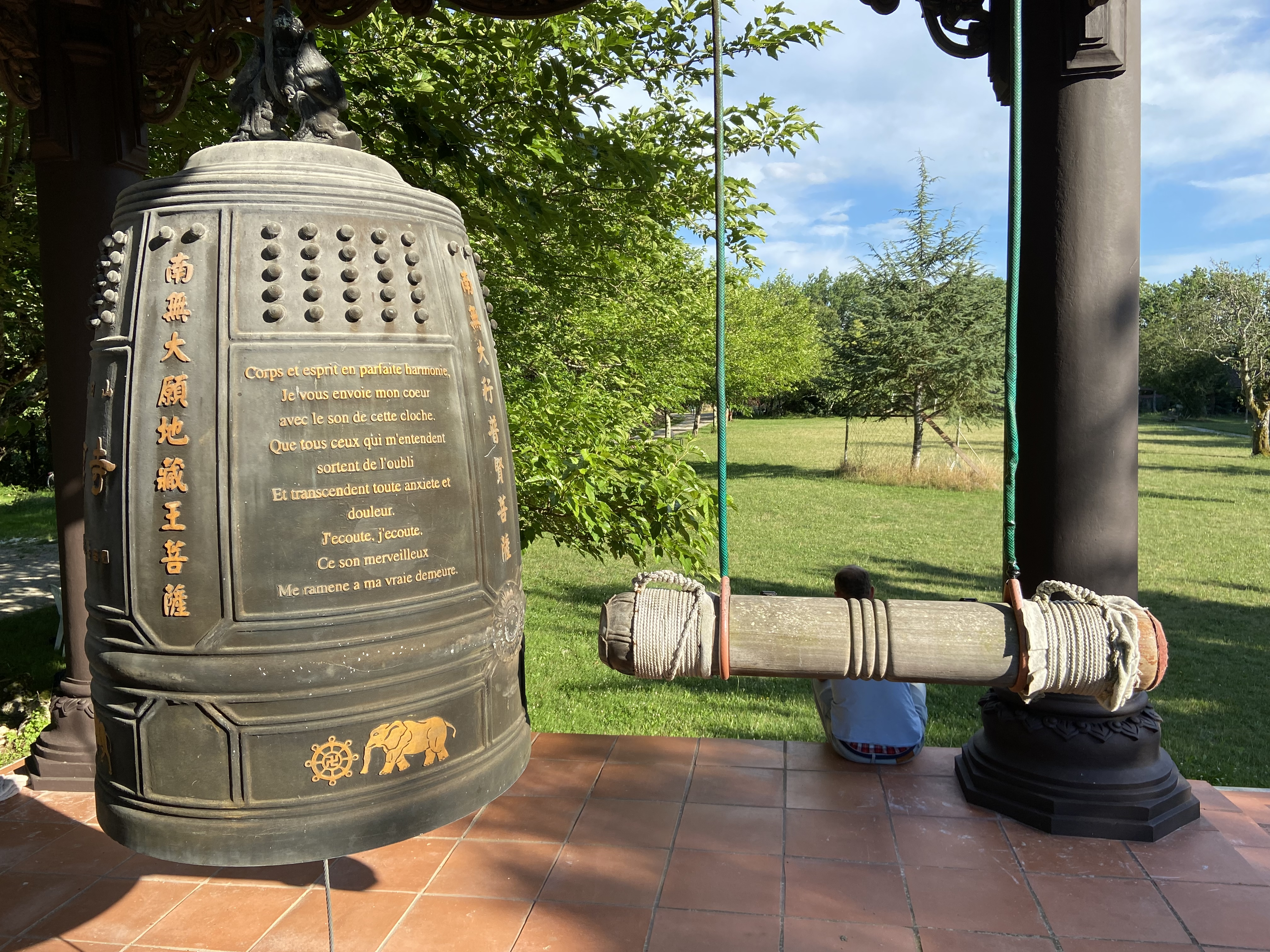
Plum Village Monastery, France

In the 50s and 60s, non-Japanese Brazilians sought out Buddhism influenced partly by translations of the works of DT Suzuki. They went to centers such as the Busshinji Temple of the Soto Zen school in São Paulo and some of them later went on to become popular Zen teachers among Brazilians such as Rosen Takashina Roshi.

In 1982, the popular Vietnamese Buddhist teacher and peace activist Thích Nhất Hạnh founded the Plum Village Monastery in Dordogne, France which, along with his hundreds of publications, has helped spread interest in Engaged Buddhism and Vietnamese Thiền (Zen).

In the 80s and 90s, the Buddhist Churches of America became involved in the debates over public textbooks promoting creationism and the use of prayer in schools.

=== Theravada ===
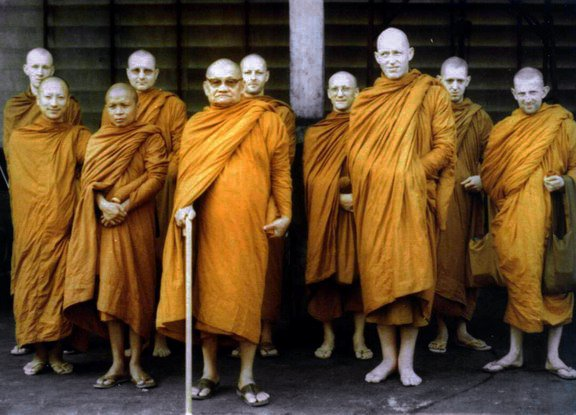
Thai Forest teacher Ajahn Chah with the senior representative of the tradition in England, Ajahn Sumedho (front right), the senior representative in North America Ajahn Pasanno (rear and left of Sumedho) and other monastics.

In 1965, monks from Sri Lanka established the Washington Buddhist Vihara in Washington, D.C., the first Theravada monastic community in the United States. The Vihara was quite accessible to English-speakers, and Vipassana meditation was part of its activities. However, the direct influence of the Theravada Vipassana movement (as known as the Insight meditation movement) would not reach the U.S. until a group of Americans returned there in the early 1970s after studying with Vipassana masters in Asia. Influential figures include Sharon Salzberg, Jack Kornfield, and Joseph Goldstein, who in 1975 founded the now influential Insight Meditation Society in Barre, Massachusetts. In 1984, Kornfield helped found the Spirit Rock Meditation Center, the major center of this tradition on the West coast. According to Coleman, both meditation centers are "organized around a community of teachers with collective decision making." A small number of Westerners who had ordained in the Theravada Thai Forest tradition have also moved back to the West and established more traditional monastic communities, such as Thanissaro Bhikkhu (founding figure and abbot of Metta Forest Monastery in California) and Ajahn Sumedho (who helped found Chithurst Buddhist Monastery in West Sussex).

=== Tibetan Buddhism ===
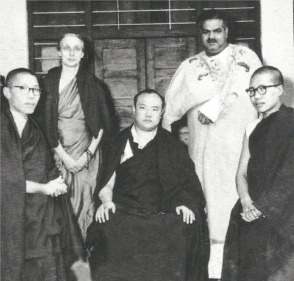
Chögyam Trungpa, Freda Bedi, Karmapa, Baba Pyare Bedi and Akong Rinpoche

The sixties counterculture had already established an interest in Tibetan Buddhism, through Timothy Leary's publication of an adaptation of the so-called Tibetan Book of the Dead under the title The Psychedelic Experience. Since the 1970s, interest in Tibetan Buddhism also grew dramatically, especially due to the arrival of Tibetan lamas in the West after the Chinese occupation of Tibet and the creation of a Tibetan diaspora. This was fueled in part by the romantic view of Tibet and also because Western media agencies (especially Hollywood) and celebrities are largely sympathetic with the 'Tibetan Cause' and with the extremely charismatic and influential figure of the Dalai Lama. The first Western woman to take full ordination in Tibetan Buddhism was Freda Bedi.

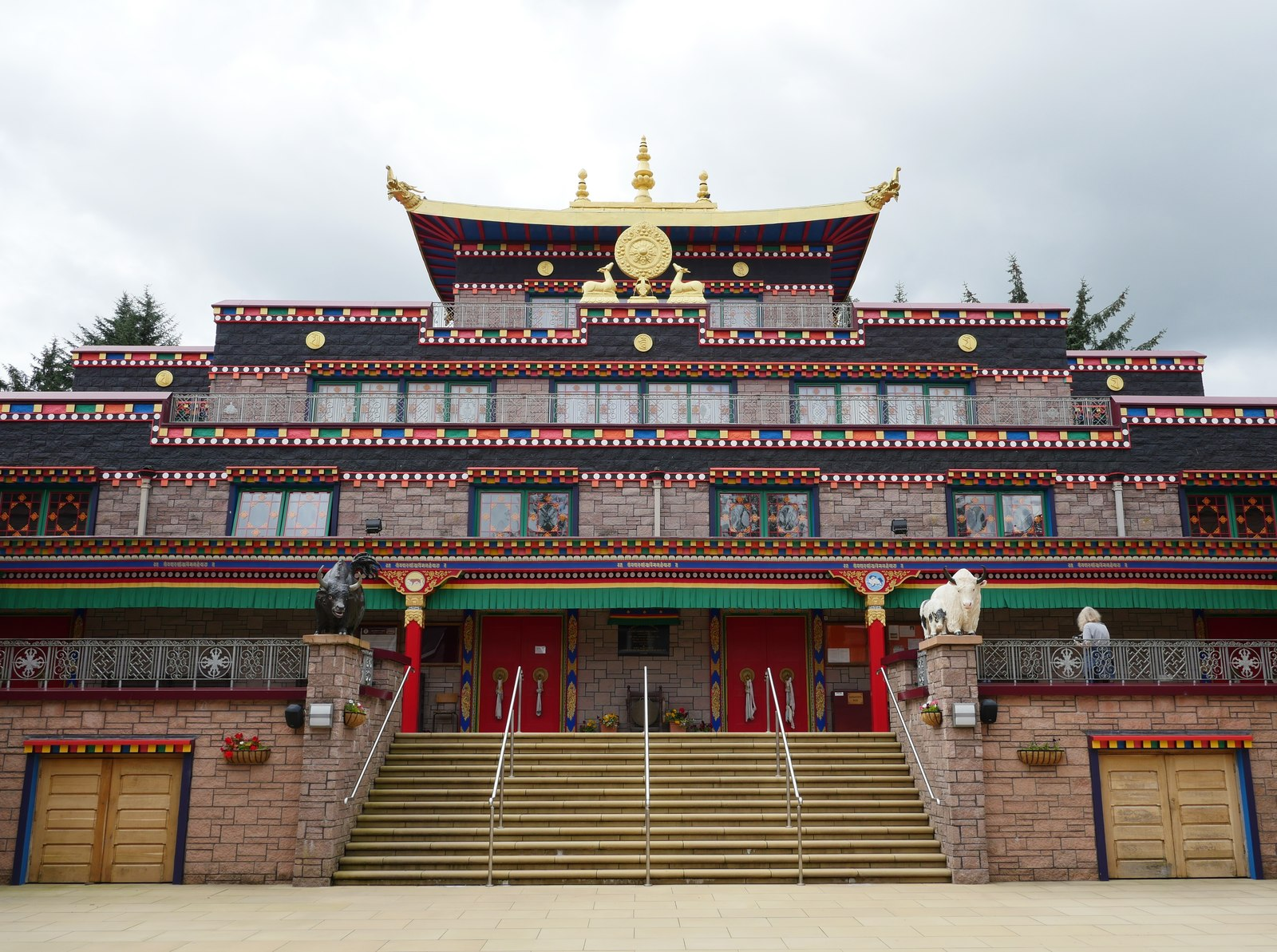
Kagyu Samye Ling temple, Scotland

Kagyu Samye Ling in Scotland was founded in 1967 by two spiritual masters, Choje Akong Tulku Rinpoche and Chogyam Trungpa Rinpoche. It was the first Tibetan Buddhist Centre to be established in the West and was named after Samye, the very first monastery to be established in Tibet. In 1977 during his second visit to Samye Ling, the 16th Karmapa assured Akong Rinpoche about the longer-term future of Buddhism in the West and at Samye Ling. It is from this encounter that the Samye Project was born. Samyé Ling now has established centres in more than 20 countries, including Belgium, Ireland, Poland, South Africa, Spain and Switzerland.

Chogyam Trungpa, later under the guidance of the Karmapa (Rangjung Rigpe Dorje), established institutions in the United States such as Naropa Institute and developed innovative teachings (Shambala training, introduced in 1977) which he saw as suited for Westerners. The Karmapa had originally told Chögyam Trungpa he would bring dharma to the west in 1954, long before Tibetan Lamas had any concept of Europe at all. In 1963 Trungpa made his first voyage to Europe. Later in Bhutan in 1968 he realized the West needed a very different approach to Vajrayana Buddhism. He then gave back his robes and went to North America.

Another controversial and successful figure in bringing Buddhism to the West is Lama Ole Nydahl. They were wild hippies when he and his wife Hannah Nydahl first met the 16th Karmapa in 1969. The combining of lay and yogi style together as one, while using the traditional practices of Ngöndro and teachings on Mahamudra is a distinct approach to bringing Vajrayana methods to Western lay practitioners. The focus is on making Karma Kagyu teachings and methods available to modern and independent thinkers in the West. In 1972, the 16th Karmapa Rangjung Rigpe Dorje requested Lama Ole Nydhal and Hannah Nydhal to establish Buddhist centers of the Karma Kagyu lineage in the Western world. Lama Ole Nydahl offered Buddhist refuge to tens of thousands of people and founded 640 Buddhist centers around the world.

In response to the ever-increasing number of people interested in the "Tibet Message" Rangjung Rigpe Dorje, 16th Karmapa established a study, retreat and meditation center in France "Dhagpo Kagyu Ling", founded in 1975, as the European seat of the Karma Kagyü school. The Gyalwa Karmapa sent two particularly qualified teachers to Dhagpo: Lama Gendun Rinpoche, a great master of meditation, and Lama Jigme Rinpoche, an accomplished spiritual master. Tarthang Tulku was another Tibetan to establish a center in the West in 1969.

Perhaps the most widely visible Buddhist teacher in the west is the much-travelled Tenzin Gyatso, the current Dalai Lama, who first visited the United States in 1979. As the exiled political leader of Tibet, he is now a popular cause célèbre in the west. His early life was depicted in glowing terms in Hollywood films such as Kundun and Seven Years in Tibet. He has attracted celebrity religious followers such as Richard Gere and Adam Yauch. All four of the main Tibetan Buddhist schools are now established in the West. Tibetan lamas such as Akong Rinpoche, Lama Gendün Rinpoche, Dudjom Rinpoche, Dilgo Khyentse Rinpoche, Chögyam Trungpa Rinpoche, Geshe Wangyal, Geshe Lhundub Sopa, Dezhung Rinpoche, Sermey Khensur Lobsang Tharchin, Lama Yeshe, Thubten Zopa Rinpoche and Geshe Kelsang Gyatso all established teaching centers in the West from the 1970s. Tibetan Lamas and their Western students also worked to translate and publish Tibetan Buddhist texts, establishing publishers such as Wisdom Publications and Shambala Publications.

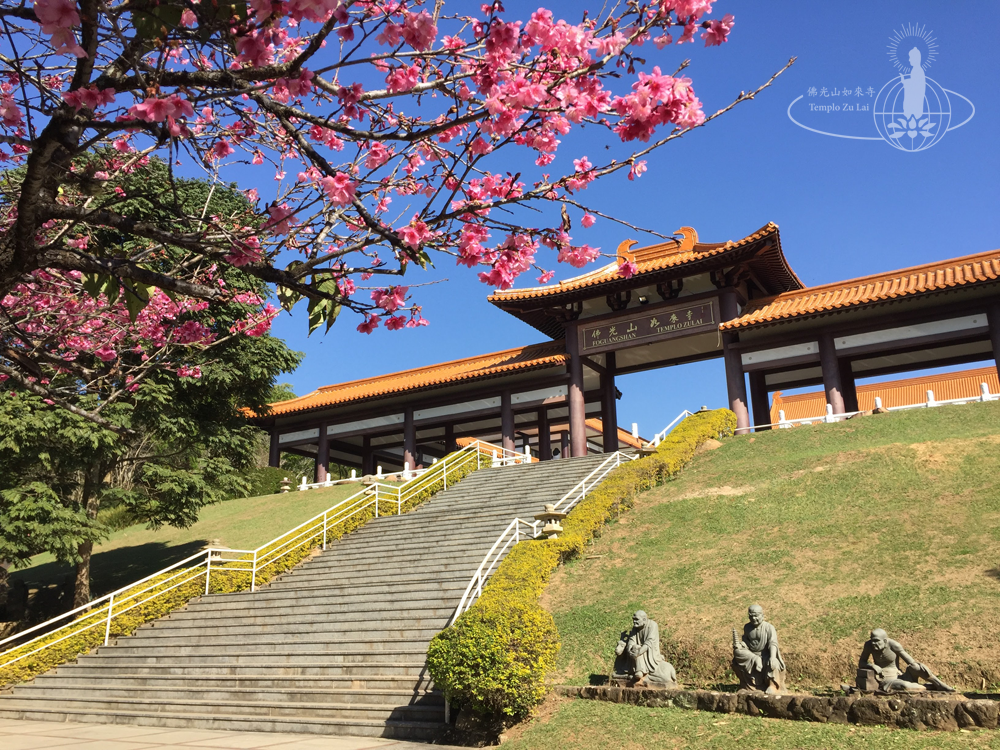
Zu Lai Temple (lit. Tathāgata Temple) in Cotia, Brazil is the largest Buddhist temple in South America.

In Brazil, the first Tibetan Buddhist center, the Tarthang Tulku Nyingma Center, was founded in 1988 in São Paulo. During the 90s, there was a rise in interest in Tibetan Buddhism, and other forms of Asian Buddhism such as Thai, Chinese, Korean and Vietnamese traditions are also present in the country. In other Latin American countries such as Argentina and Peru, there was also the introduction of Buddhism through immigration and conversion, though populations remain small (20,000 in Argentina in 2012). Japanese Zen and Tibetan Buddhism has been especially influential in these countries in the post-war 20th century.

=== Other traditions ===
In England, an influential figure is Sangharakshita, who founded a modernist and eclectic new tradition called Triratna (formerly the Friends of the Western Buddhist Order (FWBO) in 1967.

== Contemporary Western Buddhism ==
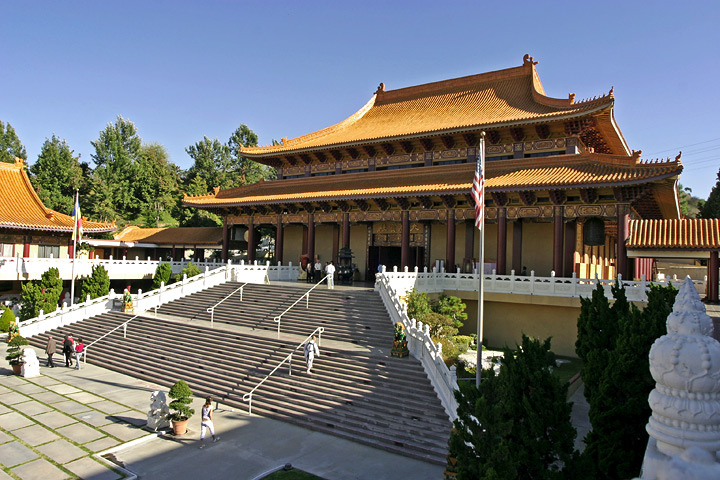
Main Hall of Hsi Lai, a Chinese-American temple in Los Angeles County, California. Completed in 1988, it is one of the largest Buddhist temples in the Western Hemisphere.

Today, Buddhism is practiced by increasing numbers of people in the Americas, Europe and Oceania. Buddhism has become the fastest growing religion in Australia and some other Western nations.

Some of the major reasons for this spread include globalization, immigration, improved literacy and education (most Westerners are first exposed to Buddhism through reading), and the breakdown of the hegemony of Christianity on Western culture.

There is a general distinction between Buddhism brought to the West by Asian immigrants, which may be Mahayana, Theravada or a traditional East Asian mix ("ethnic Buddhism"), and Buddhism as practiced by converts ("convert Buddhism"), which is often Zen, Pure Land, Vipassana or Tibetan Buddhism. Some Western Buddhists are actually non-denominational and accept teachings from a variety of different sects, which is far less frequent in Asia. A few authors have proposed that Western Buddhism, especially in its non-denominational form, may be viewed as a "new vehicle" of Buddhism alongside the traditional Theravada, Mahayana and Vajrayana – Navayana. (However, the term Navayana is more commonly used to instead refer to the Dalit Buddhist movement founded in India by Bhimrao R. Ambedkar.)

Demographically as a convert religion, Western Buddhism appeals more to whites and to the middle and upper-middle classes as well as to the politically left wing and to those who live in urban areas.

While retaining a more formalized organization, Western Buddhism has also influenced the New Age movement and is in some ways similar to it. Western Buddhism has also been influenced by the insights of western psychology and psychotherapy and many Buddhist teachers in the West are licensed therapists.

The regular practice of meditation as a central focus is also a common feature of most modern Western Buddhist groups. The exception are those groups like Soka Gakkai which are chanting focused. Much of contemporary Buddhism in the West is influenced by the spread of lay practice centers, where laypersons meet for meditation practice and also may stay for meditation retreats. While rituals are not absent in contemporary traditions, they are less likely to be seen as providing supernatural benefits.

Major Western Buddhist publications include Lion's Roar (previously Shambhala Sun) and Tricycle: The Buddhist Review.

In 2010, there were also around 6,200 Buddhists in Cuba, in various Zen groups, the Diamond Way tradition and also Soka Gakkai (the only Buddhist organization with legal status on the island). According to Frank Usarski, Buddhism remains a statistically small part of South America's religious field, "with around 500,000 practitioners and approximately 600 groups" of which around 27% are Tibetan Buddhists, 25% are Soka Gakkai and 22% are Zen.

=== East Asian Buddhism ===
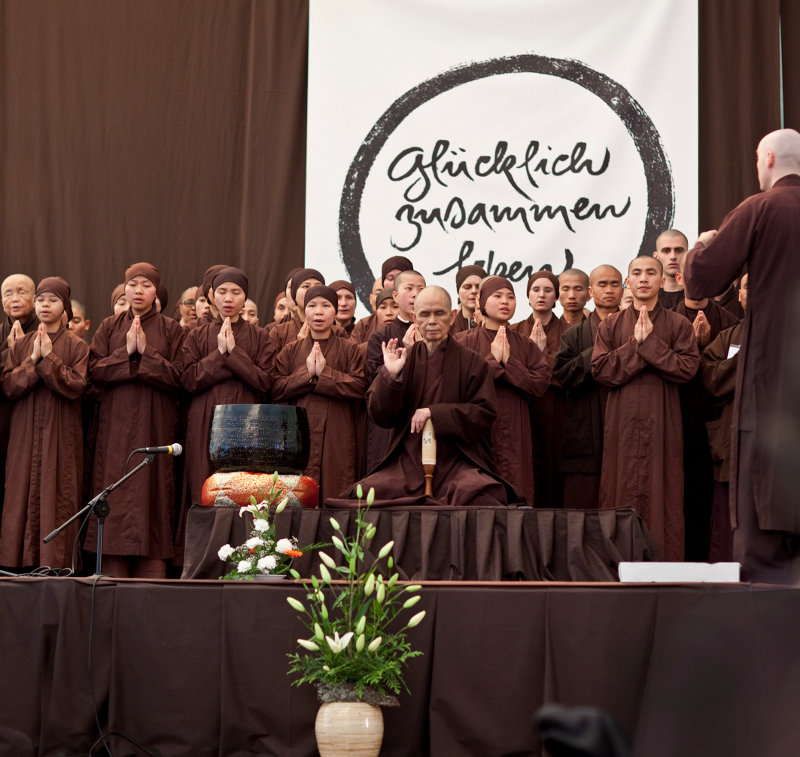
Thích Nhất Hạnh and monastics of his order chanting during his visit to Germany in 2010.

There are numerous East Asian Mahayana Buddhist traditions and communities in the West, which includes ethnic Buddhists and convert Buddhists. The oldest is the Japanese American Jōdo Shinshū Buddhist community of the Buddhist Churches of America.

Another widespread form of East Asian Buddhism in the West is Soka Gakkai, a modernist lay form of Nichiren Buddhism. In the US, SGI also has a larger proportion of African American and Hispanic American members than other convert Buddhist groups.

There are also many ethnic Buddhist temples, founded by Chinese, Vietnamese and Korean Buddhist immigrants. Ethnic Buddhist practice tends to be conducted in Asian languages and to be more traditional. Western-based Chinese Buddhist organizations are some of the most numerous immigrant Buddhists (especially in the United States) and include the Dharma Realm Buddhist Association, Fo Guang Shan and the Tzu Chi foundation.

==== Zen Buddhism ====
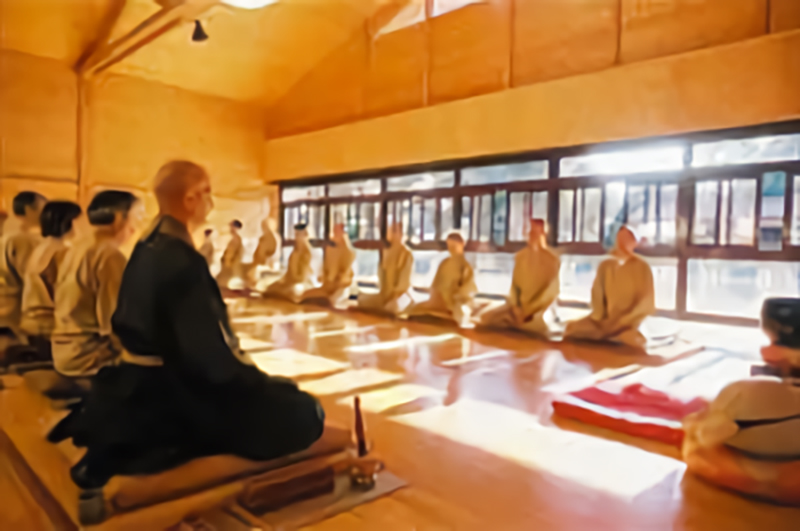
Falaise Verte Zen Centre in the Ardèche region of France

The most prominent of the East Asian Mahayana traditions in the West is Zen Buddhism, which was boosted by post-war popularity among the counterculture and influential figures like Shunryu Suzuki. Today it is a popular type of convert Buddhism, in various forms such as Japanese Zen, Vietnamese Thien and Korean Seon.

Prominent Soto Zen institutions in the West include the San Francisco Zen Center of Shunryu Suzuki, the Zen Center of Los Angeles of Hakuyu Taizan Maezumi and the International Zen Association founded by Taisen Deshimaru.

Rinzai affiliated Zen organisations include Dai Bosatsu Zendo Kongo-ji and the Mt. Baldy Zen Center in the USA and the Falaise Verte Zen Centre in France.

The international Kwan Um school of Korean Seon is a well known Korean Buddhist institution in the West, and Thích Nhất Hạnh's Order of Interbeing is a modernist Vietnamese Thien international organization.

According to Hughes Seager, in America, Zen is "primarily a movement of laity who practice monastic disciplines." These institutions tend to be more liberal than their Asian counterparts, more lay based and more likely to promote gender equality. According to Hughes Seager, Western Zen "is Anglicized. It is democratized. It is tailored to the middle-class American life-style, with its focus on the workplace and nuclear family."

=== Tibetan Buddhism ===
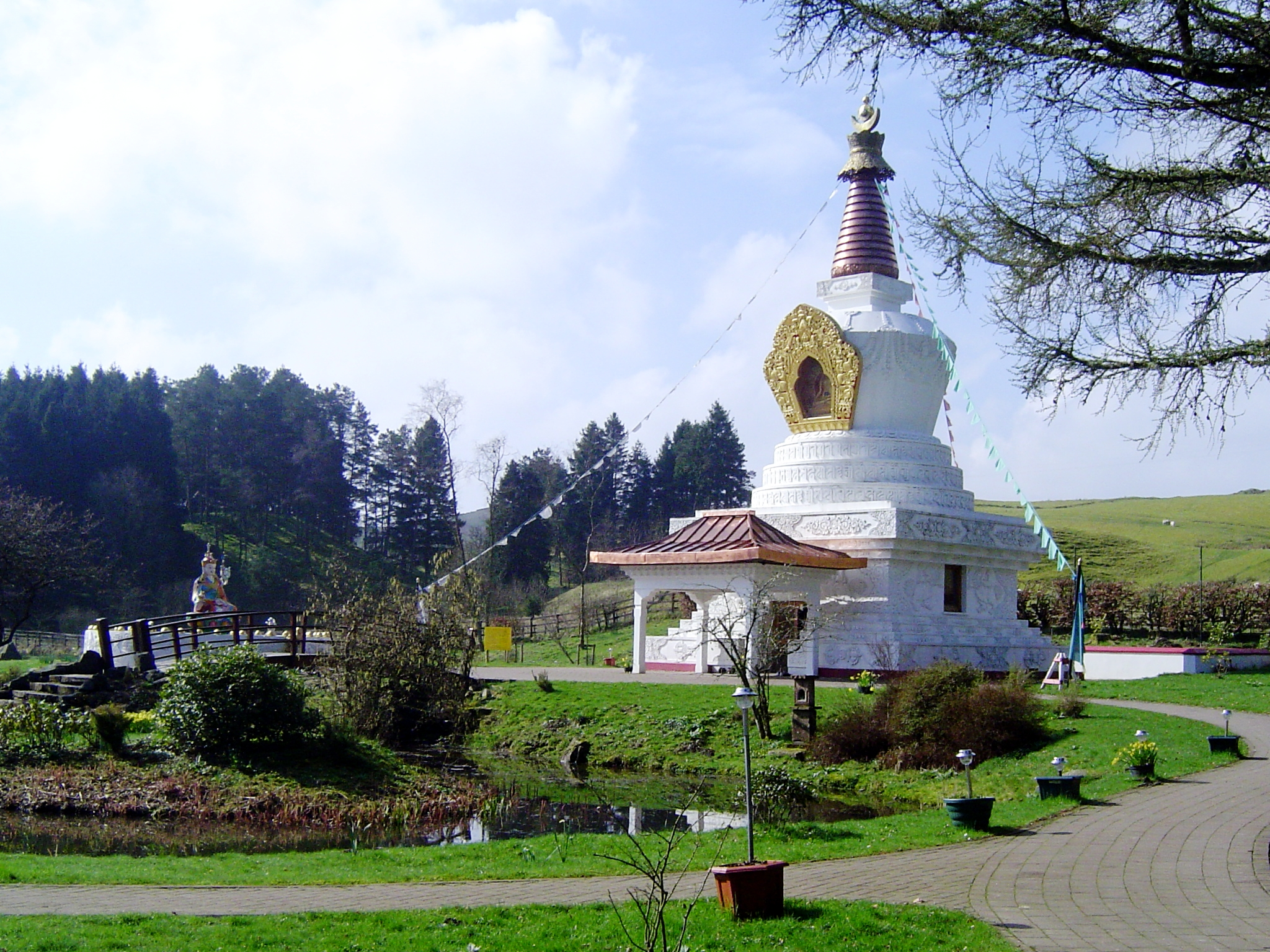
The main stupa at Kagyu Samye Ling Monastery and Tibetan Centre, Scotland.

Tibetan Buddhism in the West has remained largely traditional, keeping all the doctrine, ritual, guru devotion, etc. This is because the influential Tibetan Buddhist teachers in the West are still mostly Tibetans.

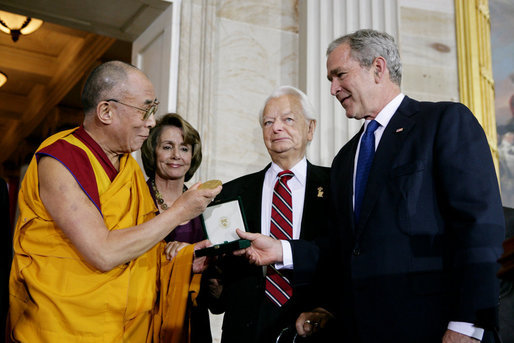
The Dalai Lama receiving a Congressional Gold Medal in 2007. From left: Speaker of the United States House of Representatives Nancy Pelosi, Senate President pro tempore Robert Byrd and U.S. President George W. Bush

An example of a large Buddhist institution established in the West is the Foundation for the Preservation of the Mahayana Tradition (FPMT). FPMT is a network of Buddhist centers focusing on the Geluk school, founded in the 1970s by Lamas Thubten Yeshe and Thubten Zopa Rinpoche. The FPMT has grown to encompass more than 142 teaching centers in 32 countries. Like many Tibetan Buddhist groups, the FPMT does not have "members" per se, or elections, but is managed by a self-perpetuating board of trustees chosen by its spiritual director (head lama), Lama Zopa Rinpoche.

Besides the large organizations or networks such as FPMT, Diamond Way Buddhism, the Dzogchen community and Shambhala International, there are also numerous independent temples, centers and communities. These include Sravasti Abbey (USA), Kagyu Samye Ling (Scotland), and Lerab Ling (France).

Westerners such as Lama Surya Das and Robert Thurman have also emerged as influential voices in the Western Tibetan Buddhist community.

=== Theravada Buddhism and Insight movement ===
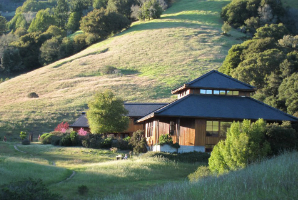
Spirit Rock Meditation Center founded 1978 by Insight teacher and student of Ajahn Chah, Jack Kornfield.

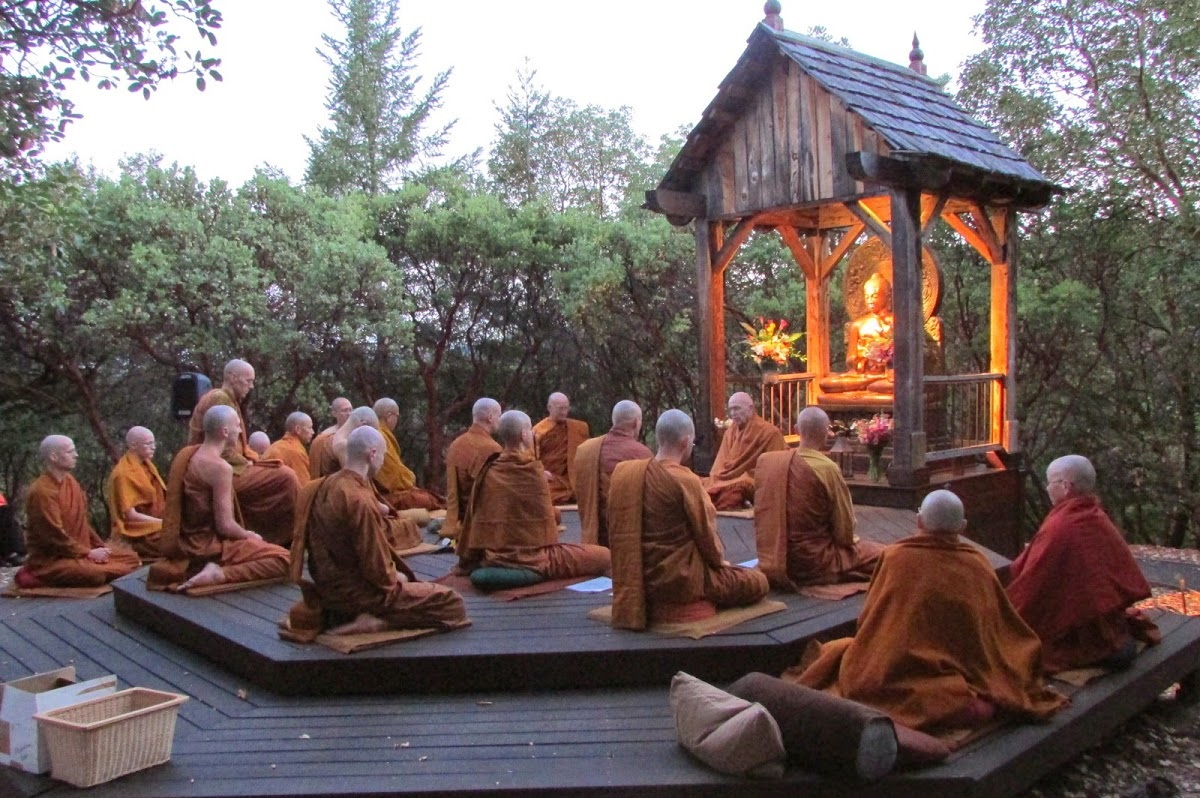
Abhayagiri Buddhist Monastery, Asalha Puja 2014

There are different forms of Theravada Buddhism in the West. One of these forms is that taken by the Asian immigrant communities and their temples, which is the most traditional and conservative, but is still undergoing change and adaptation. Some of these adaptations include the development of institutions of higher learning for their monastics as well as the establishment of retreat centers, summer camps and schools for the lay community. According to Paul Numrich, in 1996 there were around 150 Theravada temples (wats or viharas) in more than 30 US states.

Some Westerners have also adopted and brought the traditional monastic forms to the West, especially those Western monastics associated with the Thai forest tradition. Representatives of this trend are the Abhayagiri Buddhist Monastery in Northern California, the Mettā Forest Monastery in Southern California, the Birken Forest Buddhist Monastery in Canada, the Amaravati Buddhist Monastery in the UK, Santacittārāma in Italy and the Bodhinyana Monastery in Australia.

At the other end of the spectrum are the much more liberal lay convert Buddhists belonging to the Insight meditation or "Vipassana" movement. Many of the founders of this movement studied in retreat centers in Asia and then moved back to the West to establish their own meditation centers, which include the Insight Meditation Society and Spirit Rock. They tend to keep ritual and ceremony to a minimum and focus on Buddhist meditation practice in lay life (and in retreats) instead of other activities such as making merit. This style of Buddhism is also influenced by western secular humanism and psychology and tends to be presented as a secular practice or technique rather than as a religion.

=== Modernist Buddhism ===
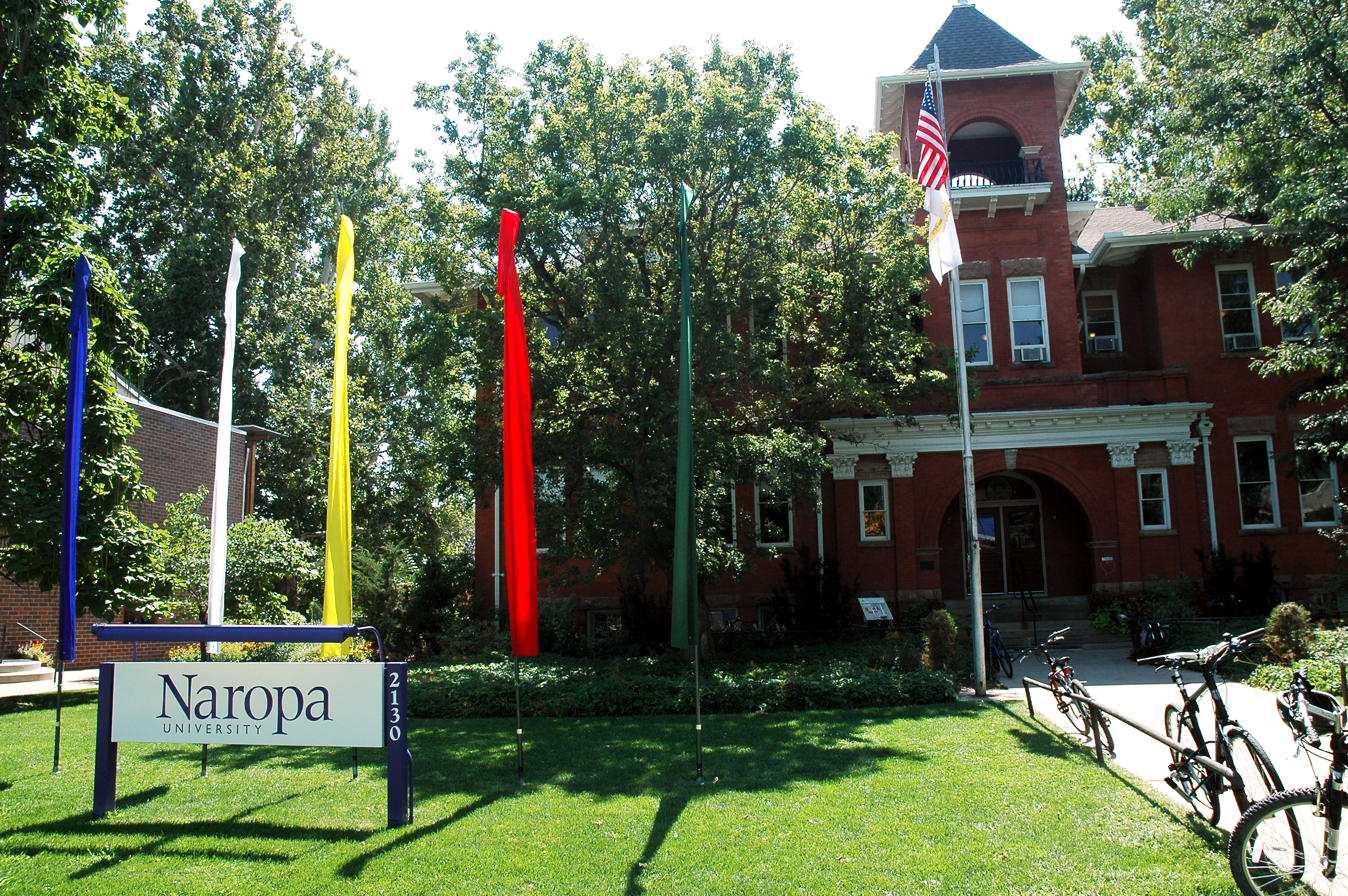
Arapahoe Campus of Naropa University, a private liberal arts college in Colorado founded by Chögyam Trungpa. It was the first Buddhist-inspired academic institution to receive United States regional accreditation.

One feature of Buddhism in the West today (especially among convert Buddhists) is the emergence of other groups which, even though they draw on traditional Buddhism, are in fact an attempt at creating a new style of Buddhist practice.

Shambhala was founded by controversial lama Chögyam Trungpa. He taught authentic Buddhist teachings within a modern-day context by making a clear distinction between the cultural aspects of Tibetan Buddhism and the fundamental teachings of Buddhism. He stripped away the ethnic baggage from traditional methods of working with the mind and delivered the essence of those teachings to his western students. His innovative Shambhala Training system was a secular path for the cultivation of the contemplative life. Chögyam Trungpa also founded Naropa University in Boulder, Colorado in 1974. Trungpa's movement has also found particular success in the Canadian province of Nova Scotia, Shambhala International being based out of Halifax.

The Triratna Buddhist Community (formerly the Friends of the Western Buddhist Order), was founded by Sangharakshita in 1967, and the Diamond Way Organisation of Ole Nydahl, has founded more than 600 Buddhist centers across the world. Diamond Way presents Buddhism in a modern context to lay practitioners, in over 30 languages. The "spiritual counsel" of the organisation is provided by Trinley Thaye Dorje (India), Kunzing Shamar Rinpoche (India) and Jigme Rinpoche (France).

The New Kadampa Tradition is a global Buddhist new religious movement founded by Kelsang Gyatso in England in 1991. It describes itself as "an entirely independent Buddhist tradition". The NKT has expanded more rapidly than any other Buddhist tradition, and currently lists more than 200 centres and around 900 branch classes/study groups in forty countries. It has been described as a "controversial" cult, and has been officially rebuked by the Dalai Lama.

=== Issues with charismatic authority and sex scandals ===
A number of groups and individuals have been implicated in sex scandals. Sandra Bell has analysed the scandals at Chögyam Trungpa's Vajradhatu and the San Francisco Zen Center and concluded that these kinds of scandals are "... most likely to occur in organisations that are in transition between the pure forms of charismatic authority that brought them into being and more rational, corporate forms of organization".

Recently further sex abuse scandals have rocked institutions such as Rigpa organization and Shambala international.

Robert Sharf also mentions charisma from which institutional power is derived, and the need to balance charismatic authority with institutional authority. Elaborate analyses of these scandals are made by Stuart Lachs, who mentions the uncritical acceptance of religious narratives, such as lineages and dharma transmission, which aid in giving uncritical charismatic powers to teachers and leaders.

== Popular culture ==
Buddhist imagery is increasingly appropriated by modern pop culture and also for commercial use. For example, the Dalai Lama's image was used in a campaign celebrating leadership by Apple Computer. Similarly, Tibetan monasteries have been used as backdrops to perfume advertisements in magazines. Hollywood movies such as Kundun, Little Buddha and Seven Years in Tibet have had considerable commercial success.

Buddhist practitioners in the West are catered for by a minor industry providing such items as charm boxes, meditation cushions, and ritual implements.

== Temples and monasteries ==
The largest Buddhist temple in the Southern Hemisphere is the Nan Tien Temple (translated as "Southern Paradise Temple"), situated at Wollongong, Australia. The largest Buddhist temple in the Western Hemisphere is the Hsi Lai Temple (translated as "Coming West Temple"), in Hacienda Heights, California, United States. Both are operated by the Fo Guang Shan Order, founded in Taiwan, and around 2003 the Grand Master, Venerable Hsing Yun, asked for Nan Tien Temple and Buddhist practice there to be operated by native Australian citizens within about thirty years. The City of 10,000 Buddhas near Ukiah, California disputes that Hsi Lai Temple is the largest in the western hemisphere and claims it is the largest. This monastery was founded by Ven. Hsuan Hua who purchased the property. "Dharma Realm Buddhist Association purchased the City of Ten Thousand Buddhas in 1974 and established its headquarters there. The City currently comprises approximately 700 acres of land and includes a comprehensive system of education, from Instilling Goodness and Developing Virtue Primary and Secondary School to Dharma Realm Buddhist University."

In 2006, a western ecumenical Buddhist temple called Dharma Bum Temple was founded in San Diego, California. The temple focuses on being an introductory center for westerners to learn more about Buddhism. It regularly hosts guest speakers from various traditions of Buddhism and is known for directing members to other Buddhist temples in the area after they start showing deeper interest in a particular form of the religion.

Benalmádena Enlightenment Stupa is in Málaga in the Andalusian region of southern Spain, overlooking Costa del Sol. Benalmádena Stupa (Chan Chub Chorten in Tibetan) is 33 m (108 ft) high and is the tallest stupa in Europe. It was inaugurated on 5 October 2003, and was the final project of Buddhist master Lopon Tsechu Rinpoche. The stupa is run by the non-profit Asociación Cultural Karma Kagyu de Benalmádena, under the spiritual guidance of the 17th Karmapa Trinley Thaye Dorje.

Chithurst Buddhist Monastery located in West Sussex, was established by Ajahn Sumedho under the auspices of his teacher, Ajahn Chah in 1979. Although the style of the monastery has been modified to accommodate Western social and cultural mores, it retains close links with Thailand especially monasteries of the Thai Forest Tradition and is supported by an international community of Asians and Westerners.

== See also ==
- Buddhism by country
- Buddhism in Australia
- Buddhism in Austria
- Buddhism in Denmark
- Buddhism in Europe
- Buddhism in Italy
- Buddhism in Russia
- Buddhism in Slovenia
- Buddhism in Sweden
- Buddhism in the United Kingdom
- Buddhism in the United States
- Global Buddhist Network
- Index of Buddhism-related articles
- Secular Buddhism
- Greco-Buddhism

== Sources ==
- App, Urs Arthur Schopenhauer and China. Sino-Platonic Papers Nr. 200 (April 2010) Archived 2010-07-04 at the Wayback Machine (PDF, 8.7 Mb PDF, 164 p.; case study of an early Western discovery of Buddhism with transcriptions and translations of primary sources)
- Baumann, Martin (2001). Global Buddhism: Developmental Periods, Regional Histories, and a New Analytical Perspective, Journal of Global Buddhism 2, 1-43
- Coleman, James William, The New Buddhism: The Western Transformation of an Ancient Tradition, Oxford University Press.
- Fields, Rick (1992), How the Swans came to the Lake - A Narrative History of Buddhism in America
- Loy, David R., "Review of Nietzsche and Buddhism: A Study in Nihilism and Ironic Affinities by R.G. Morrison Archived 2011-06-28 at the Wayback Machine", Asian Philosophy Vol. 8 No. 2 (July 1998), pp. 129–131.
- McMahan, David (2008), The Making of Buddhist Modernism, Oxford: Oxford University Press
- Hughes Seager, Richard, Buddhism in America, Columbia University Press, New York, 1999.
- Mullen, E.L., "Orientalist commercializations: Tibetan Buddhism in American popular film", Journal of Religion and Film, Vol. 2 No. 2 (October 1998).
- Prebish, Charles S; Baumann, Martin (editors); Westward Dharma Buddhism beyond Asia, University of California Press, 2002.
- Rich, Annet C., Christ or Buddha? Archived 2017-12-10 at the Wayback Machine, 1914.
- Shakya, T., "Review of Prisoners of Shangri-la by Donald Lopez", Journal of Buddhist Ethics, Vol. 6 (1999), pp. 196–199.
- Tweed, Thomas A. (2005), "American Occultism and Japanese Buddhism. Albert J. Edmunds, D. T. Suzuki, and Translocative History" (PDF), Japanese Journal of Religious Studies, 32 (2): 249–281, archived from the original (PDF) on 22 May 2012
- Tworkov, Helen, Zen in America: Profiles of Five Teachers, San Francisco: North Point Press, (1989).
- Webb, Russel (2005). "Heinz Bechert 26 June 1932–14 June 2005". Buddhist Studies Review. 22 (2): 211–216. doi:10.1558/bsrv.v22i2.14041. S2CID 247875437. Archived from the original on 10 April 2022.
