= Madame Yorska =

American actress

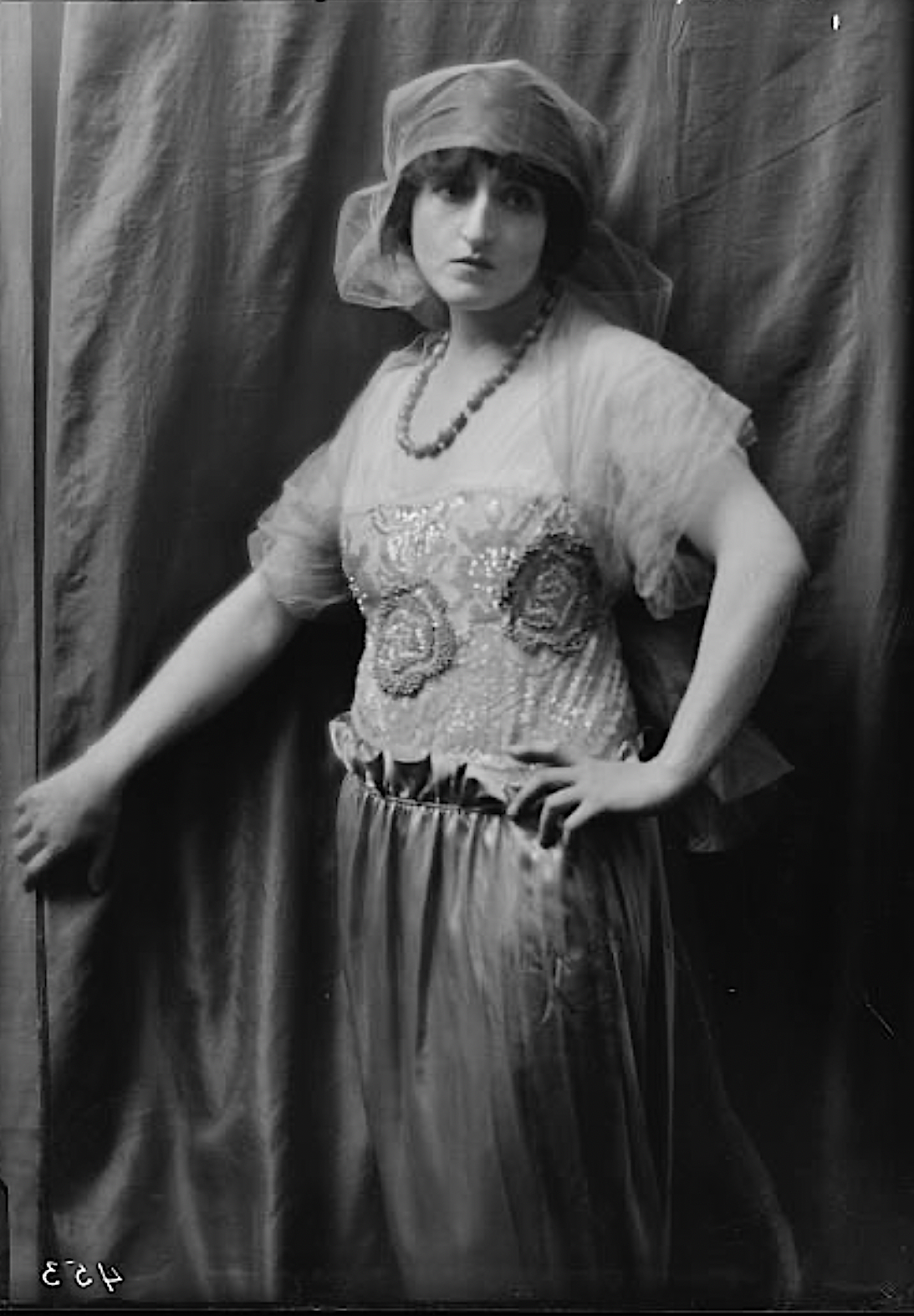
Madame Yorska in 1913.

Charlotte Marie Stern, better known by her stage names Madame Yorska, Vahslav Yorska, or Lotte Yorska, (20 December 1879 – 19 October 1971) was an American actress who was closely associated with the French repertoire. The daughter of an American mother and Russian father, she was born in New York City and raised in New York and New Orleans. As a young woman she went to Paris where she trained as an actress under Sarah Bernhardt and began her career in theaters in Paris. She went to Italy where she married the writer and journalist Count Luciano Zùccoli.

Yorska came back to the United States in 1913 and had a career on the New York stage and in American silent films in the 1910s. In New York she founded the Théâtre Français which was dedicated to performing French-language plays. She went back to France in the 1920s, and lived the remainder of her life in Paris where she died in 1971.

== Life and career ==
The daughter of Edward Otto Stern and Matilde Philomine Stern (née Druilhet), Charlotte "Lotte" Marie Stern was born in New York City on 20 December 1879. Her American mother was born in St. James Parish, Louisiana in 1855. Her father was originally from Courland in what is today Latvia but was then part of the Russian Empire. Her parents married in Paris, France in 1878. Her father was employed as a representative of the Russian Empire's consulate in New York City.

Lotte spent part of her youth living in New Orleans before heading to Europe where she studied acting in Paris with Sarah Bernhardt. Due to her father's Russian ancestry her friends gave her the nickname Yorska which led to her adoption of that name on the stage in France where she began her acting career. In 1901 she befriended the dancer Isadora Duncan whom she met in the home of artist Eugène Carrière. She also spent time in Italy where she married the writer and journalist Count Luciano Zùccoli and became a close friend of the artist Giovanni Boldini who painted a portrait of her in 1910.

In January 1913 Yorka portrayed the title role in the premiere of Grace Constant Lounsbery's play Judith. Later that year she made her Broadway debut in Marie Dressler's All Star Gambol at Weber and Fields' Music Hall. She returned to Broadway as Princess Xenia in Marion Creighton and William Elliott's The Greatest Nation (1916, Booth Theatre), and in the title role of Oscar Wilde's Salome (1918) which was presented by the Washington Square Players at the Comedy Theatre. Off Broadway she was active with the Théâtre Français (also known as the French Dramatic Society) which she founded in New York City and was dedicated to performing French dramatic repertoire.

On screen Yorska portrayed her self in the silent film Our Mutual Girl (1914). She later appeared as Juliette / Yvonne Dupré in the silent film It Happened in Paris (2019). In 1919 she was painted by the artist Aleister Crowley in which she was depicted dead with a dagger thrust into her throat.

In the 1930s, while living in Paris, Yorska became a leader in the French feminist groups, "France, le Cercle Pax Occident-Orient" and "Le Comité français pour la paix internationale", which were dedicated to not only women's causes but pacifist ones working towards disarmament. Her husband had previously died in Paris in 1929.

Yorska died in Paris, France on October 19, 1971 at the age of 91.
