= Mexico City Blues =

Poem by Jack Kerouac published in 1959

- Cover of first edition
- Author: Jack Kerouac
- Cover artist: Roy Kuhlman
- Language: English
- Publisher: Grove Press
- Publication date: 1959
- Publication place: United States
- Media type: Print (hardback and paperback)
- Pages: 244
- OCLC: 5654783
- Preceded by: Pull My Daisy
- Followed by: The Scripture of the Golden Eternity

Mexico City Blues is a long poem by Jack Kerouac, consisting of 242 "choruses" or stanzas. Written mostly in the summer of 1955, the poem was not published until late 1959. The style and mood of the work were the product of the author's spontaneous prose technique, Buddhist faith, passion for jazz, and his despondency in 1955 over his stalled writing career, especially the failure to publish a second book after his debut novel, The Town and the City (1950). Once the widely acclaimed On the Road came out in 1957, it was possible for Kerouac to find a publisher for Mexico City Blues.

== Writing and publication ==
Kerouac began writing the choruses that became Mexico City Blues while living in a Mexico City apartment, upstairs from Bill Garver, a friend of William S. Burroughs. Largely created under the influence of cannabis and morphine, the choruses were limited only by the size of Kerouac's notebook page. The poem incorporates multiple textual sources, including direct quotations; three of the choruses (52, 53 and 54) are transcriptions of conversations he had with Garver, a process that Kerouac later explained:

Old Bill Gaines (Garver) lived downstairs. I'd come every day with my marijuana and my note pad. He'd be high on opium. I had to get the opium in the slums from Tristessa. She was our connection. Bill's sitting in his easy chair in his purple pajamas, mumbling on about Minoan civilization and excavation, I'm sitting on his bed writing poems. And through the whole thing some of his words come in. Like the 52nd Chorus. Just idling all the afternoon. He talked real slow and I could put it all down. He was pleased. I'd show him what I had written and he'd say, "Oh boy, that's good."

Some of the choruses are lighthearted, containing onomatopoeia and scenic transcriptions of sounds. Other choruses, like the 211th, are serious meditations on suffering, compassion, and death:

211th Chorus

The wheel of the quivering meat
conception
Turns in the void expelling human beings,
Pigs, turtles, frogs, insects, nits,
Mice, lice, lizards, rats, roan
Racinghorses, poxy bucolic pigtics,
Horrible unnameable lice of vultures,
Murderous attacking dog-armies
Of Africa, Rhinos roaming in the
jungle,
Vast boars and huge gigantic bull
Elephants, rams, eagles, condors,
Pones and Porcupines and Pills —
All the endless conception of living
beings
Gnashing everywhere in Consciousness
Throughout the ten directions of space
Occupying all the quarters in & out,
From supermicroscopic no-bug
To huge Galaxy Lightyear Bowell
Illuminating the sky of one Mind —
Poor! I wish I was free
of that slaving meat wheel
and safe in heaven dead

The choruses often include references to real figures such as Burroughs and Gregory Corso, as well as religious figures and themes. In his 1992 monograph on Mexico City Blues, James T. Jones examined Kerouac's strong Buddhist faith at the time the poem was written. Kerouac was particularly influenced by Dwight Goddard's A Buddhist Bible and its admonition about "the unreality of all conceptions of a personal ego", and by the Buddhist emphasis on the impermanence and emptiness of forms. In fashioning a "Buddhist poetics" to express his religious ideas, Kerouac occasionally employed paradoxes to challenge conventional thinking, as in the opening lines from the 113th Chorus:

Got up and dressed up
and went out & got laid
Then died and got buried
in a coffin in the grave,
Man –
Yet everything is perfect,
Because it is empty,
Because it is perfect
with emptiness,
Because it's not even happening.

With his interest in jazz music, Kerouac likened himself in Mexico City Blues to "a jazz poet blowing a long blues in an afternoon jam session on Sunday. I take 242 choruses; my ideas vary and sometimes roll from chorus to chorus or from halfway through a chorus to halfway into the next."

After finishing the poem, and while still living in Mexico City, he wrote the novella Tristessa. Both were added to his growing collection of unpublished works. It was not until October 1957, after he had finally found a publisher for his nearly decade-old manuscript On the Road, that he sent Mexico City Blues to City Lights Books, hoping it would be included in their Pocket Poets series. But City Lights publisher Lawrence Ferlinghetti was not an admirer of Kerouac's poetry and turned it down. In 1958, following publication of On the Road's successful sequel The Dharma Bums, Kerouac's friend Allen Ginsberg tried to sell Mexico City Blues to Grove Press and New Directions Press. The poem was eventually published by Grove in November 1959.

== Critical reception ==
=== Rexroth review and other early reaction ===
Upon publication, Mexico City Blues was subjected to a scathing review by poet Kenneth Rexroth in The New York Times. Rexroth, an early champion of Ginsberg's "Howl" and San Francisco-based Beat Generation poetry, criticized Kerouac's perceived misunderstanding of Buddhism, referring to his depiction of the Buddha as "a dime-store incense burner", and sardonically concluded that he "always wondered what ever happened to those wax work figures in the old rubber-neck dives in Chinatown. Now we know; one of them at least writes books." Ginsberg, in observations recorded in Barry Gifford and Lawrence Lee's oral history, Jack's Book, attributed Rexroth's "damning, terrible" review and his condemnation of the Beat phenomenon to his feeling vulnerable because "he had now 'shown his true colors' by backing a group of unholy, barbarian, no-account, no-good people – Beatnik, unwashed, dirty, badmen of letters who didn't have anything on the ball. So he may have felt vulnerable that he originally had been so friendly, literarily, and had backed us up."

James T. Jones dubbed the Rexroth review "a model of unethical behavior in print", which "consigned one of Kerouac's richest works to temporary obscurity". Jones added that it may have been written in retaliation for Kerouac's "bad manners" or his thinly veiled portrait of Rexroth in The Dharma Bums, or as an indirect attack on the poet Robert Creeley, a Kerouac friend who had had an affair with Rexroth's wife. Creeley would later publish in Poetry a positive review of Mexico City Blues, characterizing it as "a series of improvisations, notes, a shorthand of perceptions and memories, having in large part the same word-play and rhythmic invention to be found in [Kerouac's] prose."

Gary Snyder, another Kerouac friend, read a pre-publication copy of the poem and called it "the greatest piece of religious poetry I've ever seen." The poet Anthony Hecht reviewed Mexico City Blues in The Hudson Review, declaring that "the proper way to read this book ... is straight through at one sitting." Hecht argued that Kerouac's professed aspiration to be a "jazz poet", amplified by his publishers, or his persona as an untutored swain "warbling his woodwind wild, spontaneous, simple", was an imposture, and that the book should be understood as a sophisticated "literary" work, resembling or drawing on the writings of Ezra Pound, William Carlos Williams, Gertrude Stein, E. E. Cummings and James Joyce. Hecht concluded that:

there is something valuable and beguiling behind the poetry which is as curiously difficult to get at as if the book were translated from another tongue ... But what seems to me to emerge at the end is a voice of remarkable kindness and gentleness, an engaging and modest good humor and a quite genuine spiritual simplicity.

=== Later reaction ===
The reputation of Mexico City Blues grew in subsequent years. The poem received a boost from the popular anthology The New American Poetry 1945-1960, edited by Donald Allen. Allen introduced many readers to the post-WWII avant-garde American poetry scene. His anthology included Ginsberg's "Howl Parts I & II" and twelve choruses from Mexico City Blues.

In his 1976 critical study, Jack Kerouac: Prophet of the New Romanticism, Robert Hipkiss found fault with much of Kerouac's poetry but identified Mexico City Blues as probably the writer's best work, and praised the 235th Chorus in particular. Hipkiss compared the chorus to Robert Frost's "Stopping by Woods on a Snowy Evening", and interpreted the lines, "How do I know that I'm dead / Because I'm alive / And I got work to do ...", as referring to obligations which give purpose to the narrator's life, but which are "painful and not satisfying". Unlike in Frost's poem, in Mexico City Blues "there is no satisfactory putting aside of the death wish by contemplating the 'miles to go before I sleep.'" Hipkiss regarded the poem as "an expression of the creative impulse very much for its own sake—a refusal of rules of creation and a celebration, in the act, of the spontaneity inherent in creativity." By 1983, Kerouac biographer Gerald Nicosia was calling Mexico City Blues "one of the most important poetic works in the second half of the twentieth century".

In 1992, Jones described the poem as

definitive documentation of Kerouac's attempt to achieve both psychic and literary equilibrium. He endeavored to express in a complex, ritualized song as many symbols of his personal conflicts as he could effectively control by uniting them with traditional literary techniques. In this sense, Mexico City Blues is the most important book Kerouac ever wrote, and it sheds light on all his novels by providing a compendium of the issues that most concerned him as a writer, as well as a model for the transformation of conflict into an antiphonal language.

== In other media ==
In the mid-1970s, when Bob Dylan and Allen Ginsberg went to Kerouac's hometown of Lowell, Massachusetts, as part of the Rolling Thunder Revue tour, they visited Kerouac's grave where Ginsberg recited stanzas from Mexico City Blues. Footage of the two men at the grave was featured in the film Renaldo and Clara (1978). Ginsberg later said that Dylan was already familiar with Mexico City Blues, having read it as a teenager while living in St. Paul, Minnesota.
