= It Happened in Paris =

It Happened in Paris is the title of several films:

- It Happened in Paris (1919 film), an American crime drama
- It Happened in Paris (1932 film), starring Ranny Weeks, a remake of The Two Orphans (1915)
- It Happened in Paris (1935 film), a British romantic comedy
- It Happened in Paris (1952 film), a French comedy
