= Richard Gordon Matzene =

European-born American photographer and art dealer (c.1875–1950)

Richard Gordon Matzene (born Jens Rudolph Matzene; c. 1875 – 1950) was a European-born American photographer and art dealer. He took many portrait photographs of members of high society.

== Early life ==
Matzene was born c. 1875 in Europe, either in Denmark, Hungary or in England. He took the title of Count, although there is no evidence that he was one.

== Career ==
Matzene became a portrait photographer for members of high society in Chicago in 1900. He moved to Syracuse, New York and opened an art gallery in New York City in 1909. After he went bankrupt in 1911, Matzene moved to Los Angeles, California, where he became a photographer for Hollywood actors and actresses. With David Hartford, he co-directed It Happened in Paris, a 1919 film starring Madame Yorska. In 1920, he took portrait photographs of women from Montana, and they were published in The Anaconda Standard, the main newspaper in Anaconda, Montana.

Matzene traveled internationally to take portrait photographs of the British royal family, as well Japanese and Chinese politicians like President Li Yuanhong. He was described as "one of the world's most renowned photographic portrait artists" by The Anaconda Standard in 1925. Two years later, he photographed the Nepalese Royal Family.

Matzene moved to Ponca City, Oklahoma in the 1920s, and he became an art dealer and patron. Between October 1926 and February 1927, Matzene was the resident photographer at the newly opened Victoria, British Columbia, Canada, branch of the Steffens-Colmer Studio, which was based in Vancouver, British Columbia.

By 1932, he was described in the press as "perhaps [...] the greatest antiques collector in the world." Matzene donated statues and paintings from his art collection to the University of Oklahoma's Fred Jones Jr. Museum of Art in 1935. The Ponca City Library received another donation in the 1950s.

== Personal life and death ==
Matzene married Antonia Baumer in New Orleans, Louisiana in 1909. She was an heiress.

Matzene died in 1950, aged 75 or 75.
