= It Happened in Paris (1919 film) =

1919 silent film directed by David Hartford and Richard Gordon Matzene

- Directed by: David Hartford; Richard Gordon Matzene
- Written by: Sarah Bernhardt; Jack Cunningham
- Produced by: Tod Browning
- Starring: Madame Yorska
- Cinematography: Madeline Matzen
- Distributed by: Tyrad Pictures Inc.
- Release date: 1919
- Running time: 5 reels
- Country: United States
- Language: English

It Happened in Paris, is a 1919 American silent drama crime film, directed by David Hartford and Richard Gordon Matzene. Written by Jack Cunningham and Sarah Bernhardt for her protegee Madame Yorska, Winifred Dunn served as scenario editor for the film. The film was a commercial failure.

== Cast list ==
- Madame Yorska as Juliette / Yvonne Dupré
- Lawson Butt as Romildo, the Gypsy
- Rose Dione as Creota
- Charles Gunn as Dick Gray
- Hayward Mack as Leon Naisson
- Sarah Bernhardt as herself
- David Hartford as himself

== Preservation ==
In February of 2021, It Happened in Paris was cited by the National Film Preservation Board on their Lost U.S. Silent Feature Films list and is therefore presumed lost.
