= Zen boom =

Rise in interest in Zen practices

The Zen boom was a rise in interest in Zen practices in North America, Europe, and elsewhere around the world beginning in the 1950s and continuing into the 1970s. Zen was seen as an alluring philosophical practice that acted as a tranquilizing agent against the memory of World War II, active Cold War conflicts, nuclear anxieties, and other social injustices. The surge in interest is thought to have been heavily influenced by lectures on Zen given by D.T. Suzuki at Columbia University from 1950 to 1958, as well as his many books on the subject. Authors like Ruth Fuller Sasaki and Gary Snyder also traveled to Japan to formally study Zen Buddhism. Snyder would influence fellow Beat poets from Allen Ginsberg, and Jack Kerouac, to Philip Whalen, to also follow his interest in Zen. Alan Watts also published his classic book The Way of Zen as a guide to Zen intended for western audiences.

== History ==
=== Origins ===
Zen Buddhism found its first foothold in North America due to pre-war Japanese immigration. Various temples and Buddhist associations were set up by Japanese immigrants in North America. By the 1950s various Buddhist centers were being established in Europe, Australia, and North America by immigrant monks or western disciples. Some westerners by the 1950s began to travel to Japan to receive Zen instruction. One notable teacher for westerners was Ruth Fuller Sasaki.

The lectures of D. T. Suzuki are regarded as the spring for the growing interest in Buddhism. He is a known influence on the works of Thomas Merton, John Cage, and Erich Fromm. His most prominent confidant would turn out to be Alan Watts who would devote his career to spreading Eastern philosophy to the west.

=== Beat Generation ===
Originally the lecturing of D. T. Suzuki was attended by various artists and psychotherapists. Interest in Buddhism generated by these lectures only reached small circles of beatniks. Alan Watts' work would later come to prominence and receive coverage in Time magazine. Watts' famous book Beat Zen, Square Zen, and Zen criticized American beatnik's unprincipled approach to Zen and the overly-conservative approach of Japanese disciples. Despite the criticism Beat writers were instrumental in popularizing Zen, with the most notable work being The Dharma Bums by Jack Kerouac.

In 1959, a Japanese teacher, Shunryu Suzuki, arrived in San Francisco. At the time of Suzuki's arrival, Zen had become a hot topic among some groups in the United States, especially beatniks. Suzuki's classes were filled with those wanting to learn more about Buddhism, and the presence of a Zen master inspired the students. Shunryu Suzuki's Zen Mind, Beginner’s Mind (1970), quickly became one of America's Buddhist classics. He founded the San Francisco Zen Center during the middle of the 60s counterculture (1962).

=== 1960s counterculture ===
The sixties counterculture had already established an interest in Tibetan Buddhism, through Timothy Leary's publication of an adaptation of the so-called Tibetan Book of the Dead under the title The Psychedelic Experience. Since the 1970s, interest in Tibetan Buddhism also grew dramatically, especially due to the arrival of Tibetan lamas in the West after the Chinese occupation of Tibet and the creation of a Tibetan diaspora. This was fueled in part by the romantic view of Tibet and also because Western media agencies (especially Hollywood) and celebrities are largely sympathetic with the 'Tibetan Cause' and with the extremely charismatic and influential figure of the Dalai Lama.
