= Sermey Khensur Lobsang Tharchin =

Scholar of Tibetan Buddhism

Sermey Khensur Lobsang Tharchin Rinpoche (1921– 1 December 2004) was a scholar of the Gelug school of Tibetan Buddhism. He was born in Lhasa, Tibet.
