= Weber and Fields' Music Hall =

Weber and Fields' Music Hall may refer to:

- Weber and Fields' Broadway Music Hall, a Broadway theatre active under this name from 1896 through 1904
- 44th Street Theatre, a Broadway theatre briefly known as Weber and Fields' Music Hall in 1912-1913
