= Grace Constant Lounsbery =

American author, poet and playwright

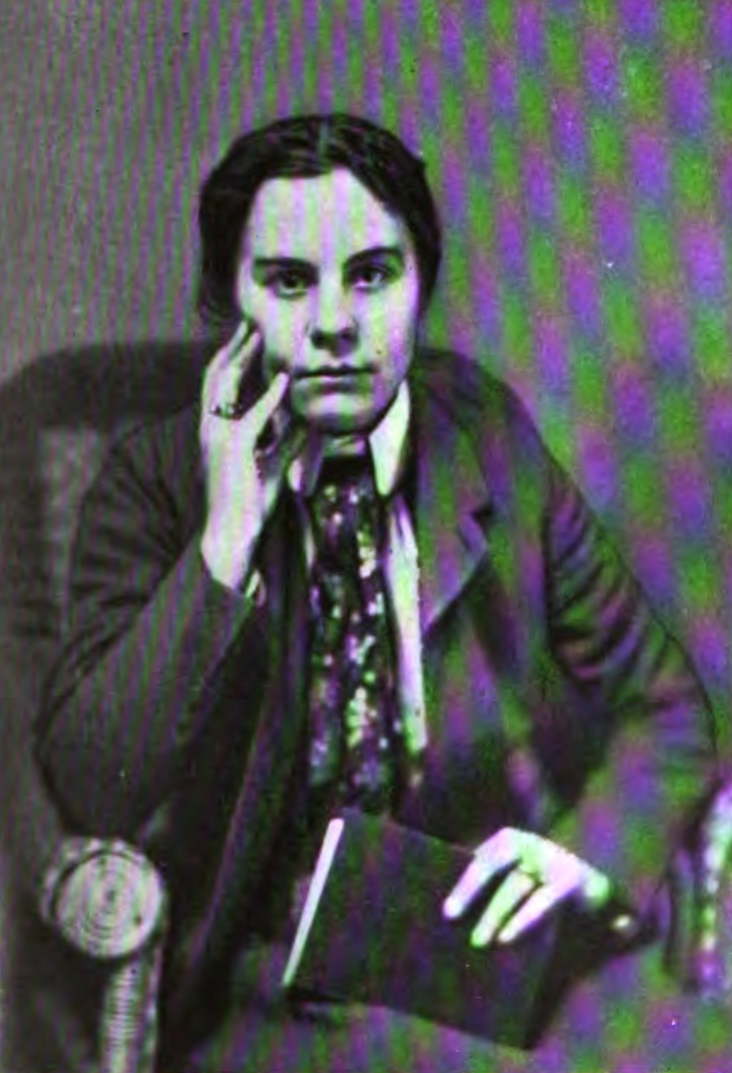
- Born: 1876
- Died: 1964
- Occupation: Writer

Grace Constant Lounsbery (1876 – 1964) was an American author, poet and playwright. She also founded a Buddhism society in France.

== Biography ==
Her mother named her Grace Constant. She adopted the last name Lounsbery from a prestigious branch of her family, writing as G. Constant Lounsbery. She graduated from Bryn Mawr College. Lounsbery was friends with Gertrude Stein and often hosted gatherings at the family home in Baltimore.

Lounsbery's play L'Escarpolette (in English, The Swing) opened at Sarah Bernhardt's playhouse in Paris in 1904. The play is based upon Fragonard's 18th-century painting of the same name, which depicts a flirtation between a young man and a woman on a swing. Bernhardt played the young man. The play was a benefit for Jews in Russia.

Her doings in Paris were reported back to the United States by gossip columnists. They found her fascinating and often remarked on her masculine manner of dress and behavior, with one reporter calling her "an out-door lady of manly sports" who used the initial G to obscure her feminine name. Lounsbery moved in a circle of lesbians in Paris. Gertrude Stein wrote of an early romantic relationship with Lounsbery in Q.E.D. (Quod Erat Demonstrandum), written in 1903 but not published until 1950. Lounsbery also hosted literary and artistic salons; Stein and Ernest Hemingway met Ezra Pound at one of these evenings.

In the poem Satan Unbound Lounsbery advocated for a spirit of rebellion embodied by the figure of Satan. She reminded the reader that the American Revolution was a rebellion, and felt that a similar rebellion was needed to bring about socialism. She was inspired to write about Satan and rebellion by the work of Percy Bysshe Shelley.

In 1929 Lounsbery founded a Buddhism society in France which was influential in popularizing Buddhism for French and Western people.

== Selected work ==
- An Iseult Idyll and Other Poems (1901) London, New York: John Lane
- Delilah, a drama in three acts (1904) New York: Scott-Thaw company
- Poems of revolt, and Satan unbound (1911) New York: Moffat, Yard and company
- Buddhist Meditation in the Southern School: Theory and Practice for Westerners (1950) London
