= The Scripture of the Golden Eternity =

Book by Jack Kerouac

- First edition
- Author: Jack Kerouac
- Language: English
- Genre: Prose poems
- Publisher: Corinth Books
- Publication date: 1960
- Publication place: United States

The Scripture of the Golden Eternity is a book of 66 prose poems written by American novelist and poet Jack Kerouac, first published in 1960 by Corinth Books, New York City. The book is Kerouac's sutra on Buddhist philosophy, in which he describes a "Golden Eternity" that is paradoxically everything and nothing.

The 66 prose poems or "meditations" deal mainly with the nature of consciousness and the impermanence of existence. The main influence is Buddhism, but the use of the word "scripture" in the title alludes to Kerouac's Catholic upbringing and influences, evident in this work and others.
