= Ernest Ross =

Ernest Ross may refer to:

- Earnest Ross (born 1991), American basketball player
- Ernest Reinhold Rost (1872–1930), British medical doctor and Buddhist, son of Reinhold Rost
- Ernie Ross (1880–1950), Canadian baseball player
- Ernie Ross (1942–2021), British politician
