= Gordon Douglas =

Gordon Douglas may refer to:

- Gordon Douglas (director) (1907–1993), American film director
- Gordon Douglas (monk), the first Western monk in Buddhism

== See also ==
- Sandy Douglass (Gordon K. Douglass), sailor
- Gordon, Douglas County, Wisconsin
