= Fred Gardner =

Fred, Frederick or Freddy Gardner may refer to:

- Fred Gardner (activist), American activist and author
- Fred Gardner (cricketer) (1922–1979), English cricketer and footballer
- Fred Gardner (rugby league) (1909–1999), Australian rugby league footballer
- Fred Gardner (politician), member of the Kansas House of Representatives
- Freddy Gardner (1910–1950), British jazz musician
- Frederick D. Gardner (1869–1933), American coffin and hearse manufacturer and governor of Missouri
- Frederick Leigh Gardner (1857–1930), British occultist

== See also ==
- Fred Gardiner (disambiguation)
- Gardner (surname)
