= Fred Gardiner (disambiguation) =

Fred Gardiner (1895–1983) was a Canadian politician, lawyer and businessman.

Fred or Frederick Gardiner may also refer to:

- Frederick Gardiner (radiologist) (1874–1933), Scottish radiologist and dermatologist
- Frederick Gardiner (mountaineer) (1850–1919), British ship-owner, explorer and mountaineer
- Fred Gardiner (rugby union) (1874–1921), Irish rugby union international
- Fritz Gardiner (1874–1935), South African jurist

== See also ==
- Fred Gardner (disambiguation)
- Gardiner (surname)
