= Malcolm Searle =

South African judge

The Honourable Sir Malcolm Searle QC
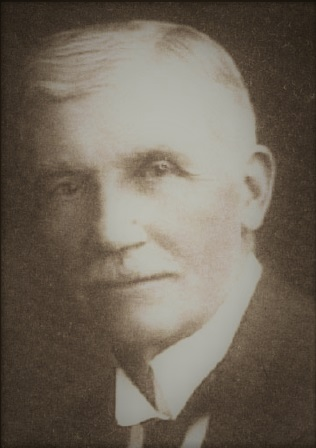

Judge President of the Cape Provincial Division
- In office 1922–1926
- Preceded by: Sir John Gilbert Kotzé
- Succeeded by: Fritz Gardiner

Judge of the Cape Provincial Division of the Supreme Court
- In office 1910–1922

Personal details
- Born: Malcolm William Searle; 7 December 1855 Blackheath, Kent, England
- Died: 9 June 1926 (aged 70) Salt River, Cape Town, Union of South Africa
- Education: St Catharine's College, Cambridge
- Profession: Advocate

Sir Malcolm William Searle QC (7 December 1855 – 9 June 1926) was a South African jurist and Judge President of the Cape Provincial Division of the Supreme Court.

== Early life ==
Searle was born in England, the son of Walter Searle and Margaret McIntyre and in 1861, as a young child, he emigrated with his parents to the Cape Colony, where his father became a prominent merchant in Cape Town. Searle received his schooling at the Diocesan College in Rondebosch. After obtaining his BA degree in 1875, he went to England and continued his studies at St Catharine's College, Cambridge. The following year, 1876, he joined the Inner Temple. He was called to the bar in England during January 1882, after which he returned to Cape Town.

== Career ==
Searle began practicing as an advocate in the Cape at the end of 1882. In 1893 he became Queen's Counsel and was also appointed legal adviser to the High Commissioner for Southern Africa, a position he held until 1900. He received his first appointment as an acting judge in 1894, when he served at the Eastern Districts Court. In 1910 he was appointed a judge in Cape Town. He became Judge President of the Cape Provincial Division in 1922 and held this post until his sudden death 1926. In 1923, he was knighted and in the same year, he was the presiding judge in the important treason trial of General Manie Maritz, whom he convicted and sentenced to three years in prison.

In the field of education, Searle was a member of the council of the University of the Cape of Good Hope, and its vice-chancellor from 1916 until 1918.

== Personal life ==
Searle married Emma Jane St Leger in 1889 and they had six children. Their second son, Frederick St Leger Searle, also became a judge in the Cape Provincial Division in 1946. Searle was killed in the Salt River train disaster on 9 June 1926, when a train was derailed by a coupling lodged in the track. The rear cars broke away and two of them hit an overbridge killing 17 people.
