= Reinhold Rost =

German orientalist

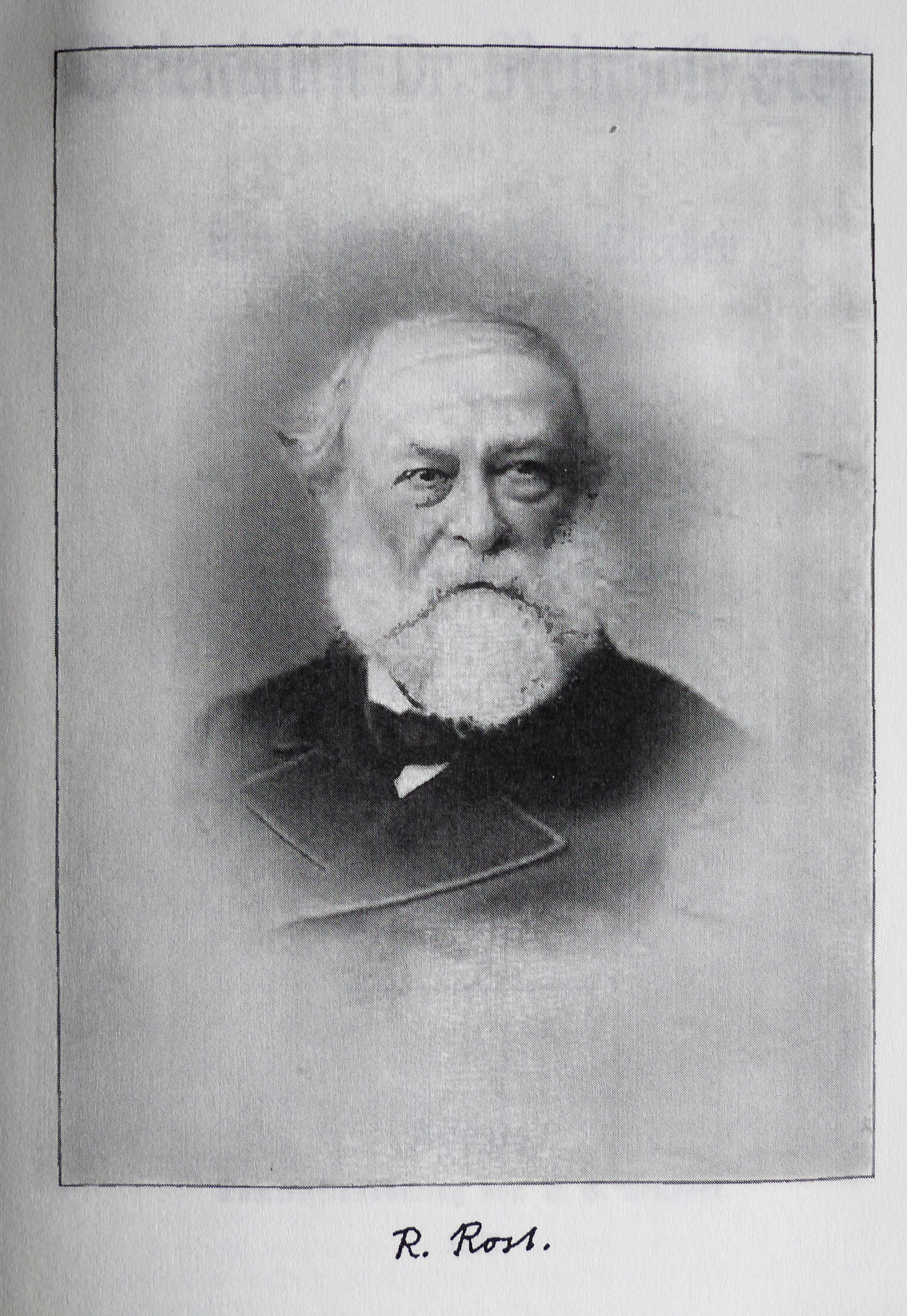
Orientalist Reinhold Rost (1822-1896), head librarian to the India Office Library, about 1890

Reinhold Rost (1822–1896) was a German orientalist, who worked for most of his life at St Augustine's Missionary College, Canterbury in England and as head librarian at the India Office Library, London.

== Life ==
Letter by Rost (1893)

He was the son of Christian Friedrich Rost, a Lutheran minister, and his wife Eleonore Glasewald, born at Eisenberg in Saxen-Altenburg on 2 February 1822. He was educated at the Eisenberg gymnasium school, and, after studying under Johann Gustav Stickel and Johann Gildemeister, graduated Ph.D. at the University of Jena in 1847. In the same year he came to England, to act as a teacher in German at the King's School, Canterbury. After four years, on 7 February 1851, he was appointed oriental lecturer at St. Augustine's Missionary College, Canterbury, founded to educate young men for mission work. This post he held for the rest of his life.

In London, Rost met Sir Henry Creswicke Rawlinson, and was elected, in December 1863, secretary to the Royal Asiatic Society, a post he held for six years. Through Rawlinson he became on 1 July 1869 librarian at the India Office, on the retirement of FitzEdward Hall, and imposed order on its manuscripts. He secured for students free admission to the library. He retired in 1893 after 24 years of service at the age of 70. His successor as head librarian of the India Office Library became the Orientalist and Sanskritist Charles Henry Tawney (1837–1922).

Rost gained many distinctions and awards. He was created Hon. LL.D. of Edinburgh in 1877, and a Companion of the Indian Empire in 1888. He died at Canterbury on 7 February 1896.

Rost maintained a close friendship with Filipino novelist José Rizal, who visited London in 1888.

== Works ==
Rost was familiar with some twenty or thirty languages in all. His own works were:

- Treatise on the Indian Sources of the Ancient Burmese Laws, 1850.
- A Descriptive Catalogue of the Palm Leaf MSS. belonging to the Imperial Public Library of St. Petersburg, 1852.
- Revision of Specimens of Sanscrit MSS. published by the Paleographical Society, 1875.

Rost's India Office Library catalogue of Sanskrit works was a significant bibliographic advance. He edited:

- Horace Hayman Wilson, Essays on the Religions of the Hindus and on Sanscrit Literature, 5 vols. 1861–5;
- Brian Houghton Hodgson, Essays on Indian Subjects, 2 vols. 1880;
- Miscellaneous papers relating to Indo-China and the Indian Archipelago (Trübner's "Oriental Series", 4 vols. 1886–8);
- The last three volumes of Trübner's Oriental Record; and
- Trübner's series of Simplified Grammars.

He contributed notices of books to Luzac's Oriental List, articles on "Malay Language and Literature", "Pali", "Rajah", and "Thugs" to the ninth edition of the Encyclopædia Britannica, and published in The Athenæum and The Academy.

== Family ==
Rost married, in 1863, Minna, daughter of late Chief-justice J. F. Laue, of Magdeburg; they had seven children, two of whom died in childhood. Son Ernest Reinhold Rost (born 1872) became Major of the Indian Medical Service (IMS), led newly founded Yangon General Hospital in Rangoon (Burma) and was active in the propagation of Buddhism in England.

== Biography ==
- Oskar Weise: Der Orientalist Dr. Reinhold Rost, sein Leben, und sein Streben. Leipzig: Teubner 1897. 71 p. (Mitteilungen des Geschichts- und Altertumsforschenden Vereins zu Eisenberg).
