= Fritz Gardiner =

South African judge

The Honourable Fritz Gardiner KC

Judge President of the Cape Provincial Division of the Supreme Court
- In office 1926–1935
- Preceded by: Sir Malcolm Searle
- Succeeded by: H. S. van Zyl

Judge of the Cape Provincial Division of the Supreme Court
- In office 1914–1926

Personal details
- Born: Frederick George Gardiner; 19 April 1874 London, England
- Died: 22 August 1935 (aged 61) Rondebosch, Cape Town, Union of South Africa
- Education: University of the Cape of Good Hope; Keble College, Oxford
- Profession: Advocate

Frederick "Fritz" George Gardiner KC, (19 April 1874 – 22 August 1935) was a South African jurist and Judge President of the Cape Provincial Division of the Supreme Court.

== Early life ==
Gardiner was born in England. His father, Edward Bennett Gardiner was born in Ireland and his mother, Sidonia Auguste Friederike von Doeringk was born in Teplice, Bohemia, the daughter of an Austrian army officer. In 1878 the family emigrated to the Cape Colony and his father became an assistant general manager of the Standard Bank of South Africa. Gardiner finished his schooling at the Diocesan College, whereafter he completed his BA degree at the University of the Cape of Good Hope, with Literature and Philosophy as his major subjects. He then continued his studies at Keble College, Oxford and in 1895 he obtained a BA (Hons) degree in Jurisprudence.

== Career ==
Gardiner was admitted to the bar as member of the Middle Temple, London in 1896. After a year in London, he returned to Cape Town and joined the Cape bar in 1897. In 1907 he received an acting judge appointment at the Natal Court. In February 1912 he came a King's Counsel and in 1913 again acted as a judge in Natal and also received an acting appointment at the Cape Provincial Division. Gardiner was appointed a permanent judge in Cape Town in October 1914. After Sir Malcolm Searle was killed in a train accident in June 1926, Gardiner was appointed the Judge President of the Cape Provincial Division of the Supreme Court on the 1st of August 1926.

In 1934, the University of Cape Town conferred an honorary LLD on him.

== Personal life ==
Gardiner married Julia Stella Clare Brailey on 8 January 1901 in the St. Saviour's Church, Claremont, Cape Town. A son and four daughters were born from the marriage. Gardiner died at his house, named Westridge, in Rondebosch, Cape Town on 23 August 1935.
