= Ernest Reinhold Rost =

English physician and Buddhist writer

- Born: 22 August 1872; Ealing
- Died: 23 June 1930 (aged 57); Putney
- Occupations: Physician, writer

Lieutenant-colonel Ernest Reinhold Rost (22 August 1872 – 23 June 1930) O.B.E. was an English physician and Buddhist writer.

== Biography ==
Rost was born at Ealing on 22 August 1872. He was the son of Reinhold Rost. He was educated at Highgate School and at St. Mary's. He took the M.R.C.S. and L.R.C.P. in 1895 and joined the Indian Medical Service (IMS) as surgeon lieutenant on 29 January 1896. He became lieutenant-colonel on 29 July 1915. He retired on 3 September 1922. He was a civil surgeon in Burma and worked at Rangoon Medical School where he was superintendent and a lecturer in surgery.

He served in East Africa during World War I and on the North-West Frontier of India during the Third Anglo-Afghan War of 1919. After retirement he practiced in Putney and specialized in tropical diseases under the Ministry of Pensions. He conducted important work on leprosy. On 1 January 1913 he received the Kaisar-i-Hind Medal and the O.B.E. on 3 June 1918.

Rost established the first bacteriological laboratory in Burma and was the first to establish a connection between beriberi and rice consumption. In 1904, Rost cultivated the bacillus leprae. He advocated the use of leprolin to treat leprosy patients. The serum was a liquid substance obtained by dissolving leprosy germs in a bouillon made from beef juice and distilled pumice stone.

== Buddhism ==
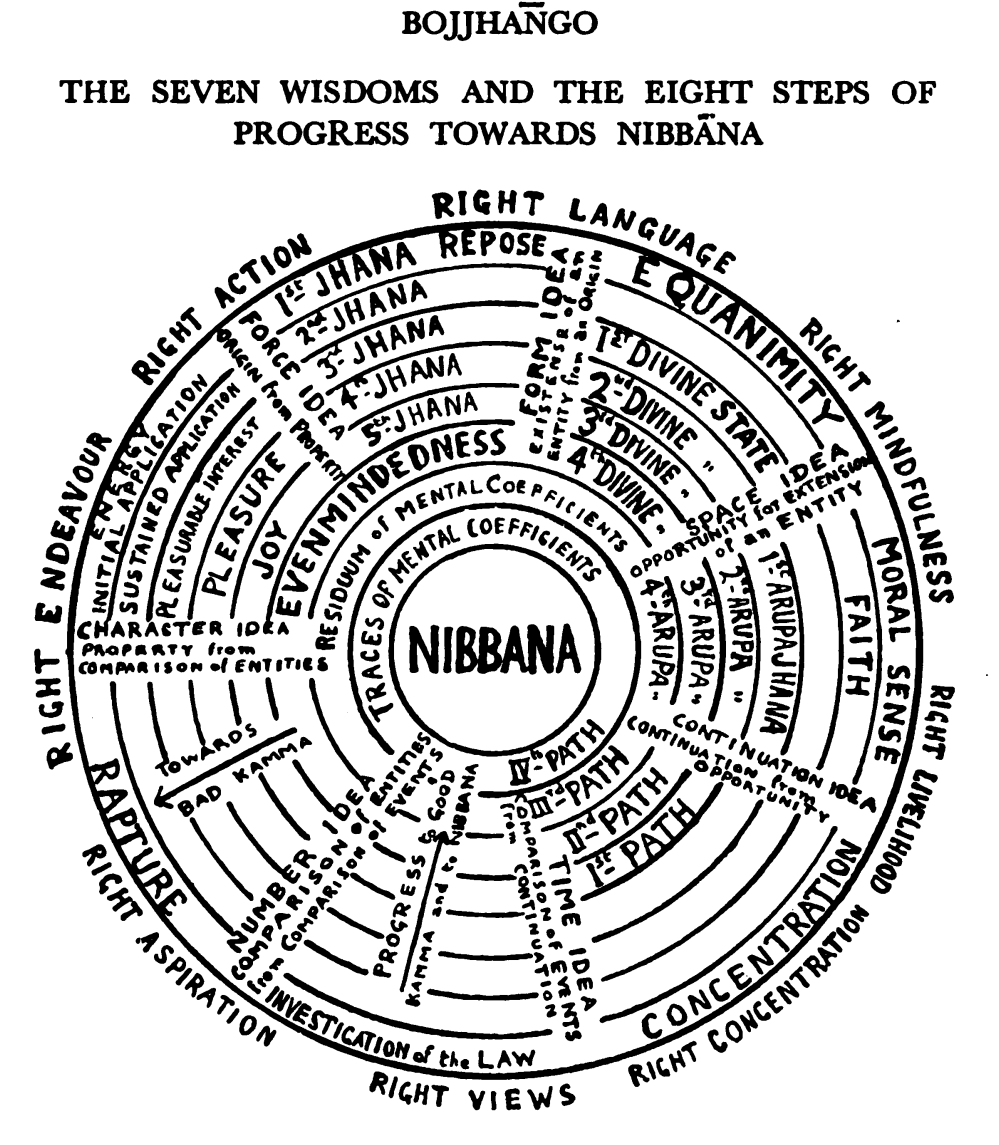
"The Seven Wisdoms and the Eight Steps of Progress Towards Nibbāna", 1930

Rost converted to Buddhism during his medical service in Burma. In Rangoon, Rost co-founded the International Buddhist Society known as Buddhasāsana Samāgama with Ananda Metteyya. He was Honorary Secretary of the Society. The first meeting was held on 15 March 1903. In 1907, Rost and his friend Col. J. R. Pain opened a Buddhist book shop on Bury Street near the British Museum.

In November 1907, Rost and others founded the Buddhist Society of Great Britain and Ireland with Thomas William Rhys Davids as president. It was the first Buddhist society in England and was active until 1926. The society published an early periodical, The Buddhist Review which reflected a scholarly approach to Buddhism.

Rost was an early British writer to discuss meditation. In 1911 in an article for The Buddhist Review, he argued that use of the word is "opposed to its use in ordinary English, where it merely means abstract thinking". During the early 20th century there was confusion about meditation from westerners and Rost was asked by people during his lectures to give practical lessons in meditation as they were under the impression that "the trances could be attained by some device which they thought could be taught like a conjuring trick." Rost dispelled such notions and suggested that contemplation and morality are far more important.

== Selected publications ==
- The Nature of Consciousness (1930)
- The Spread and Influence of Buddhism in Asia (1930)
