= Frederick Leigh Gardner =

British occultist

Frederick Leigh Gardner (1857–1930) was a British occultist and member of various initiatory orders, among them the Hermetic Order of the Golden Dawn.

== Early life ==
Gardner was born in London on 31 March 1857, the son of an accountant. His parents were spiritualists and psychic sessions were held at his house, and sometimes, the young Gardner "incorporated" an Indian guide.

== Career ==
He began his career as a clerk for a stockbroker, eventually becoming, himself, in 1886, a broker at the Stock Exchange, where he retired in 1903, becoming an antiquarian bookseller.

His interest in occultism elevated him to join the Freemasons, the Societas Rosicruciana in Anglia (becoming the librarian) and the Theosophical Society (1884). It was the environment of this Order that he met the woman he would marry.

He corresponded frequently with the Rev. William Alexander Ayton, a student of alchemy and member of the Hermetic Order of the Golden Dawn, which Gardner would eventually join.

== Publications ==
He wrote Catalogue Raisonné of Works on the Occult Sciences, a private edition published in three volumes on the occult sciences, consisting of Rosicrucian, astrological and Masonic texts, which is still a source of reference for scholars of occultism.
