= Gordon Douglas (monk) =

English Buddhist monk

Gordon Douglas has traditionally been seen as the first European to become ordained as a Bhikkhu in Southeast Asia, although Laurence Carroll (U Dhammaloka) and others are now understood to have been earlier. He was ordained in Siam in 1899 or 1900 and assumed the name Bhikkhu Asoka or Bhikkhu Ashoka. There are conflicting accounts of what happened after his ordination. One account is that he died six months later, the cause being cholera. The other account is that he relocated to Ceylon (now Sri Lanka) and lived there until his death in 1905. The latter is more likely because Dr. Cassius Pereira, later Bhikkhu Kassapa Thera, gives an account of him in Ceylon and interacting with his family.
