= List of Buddhist temples in the United Kingdom =

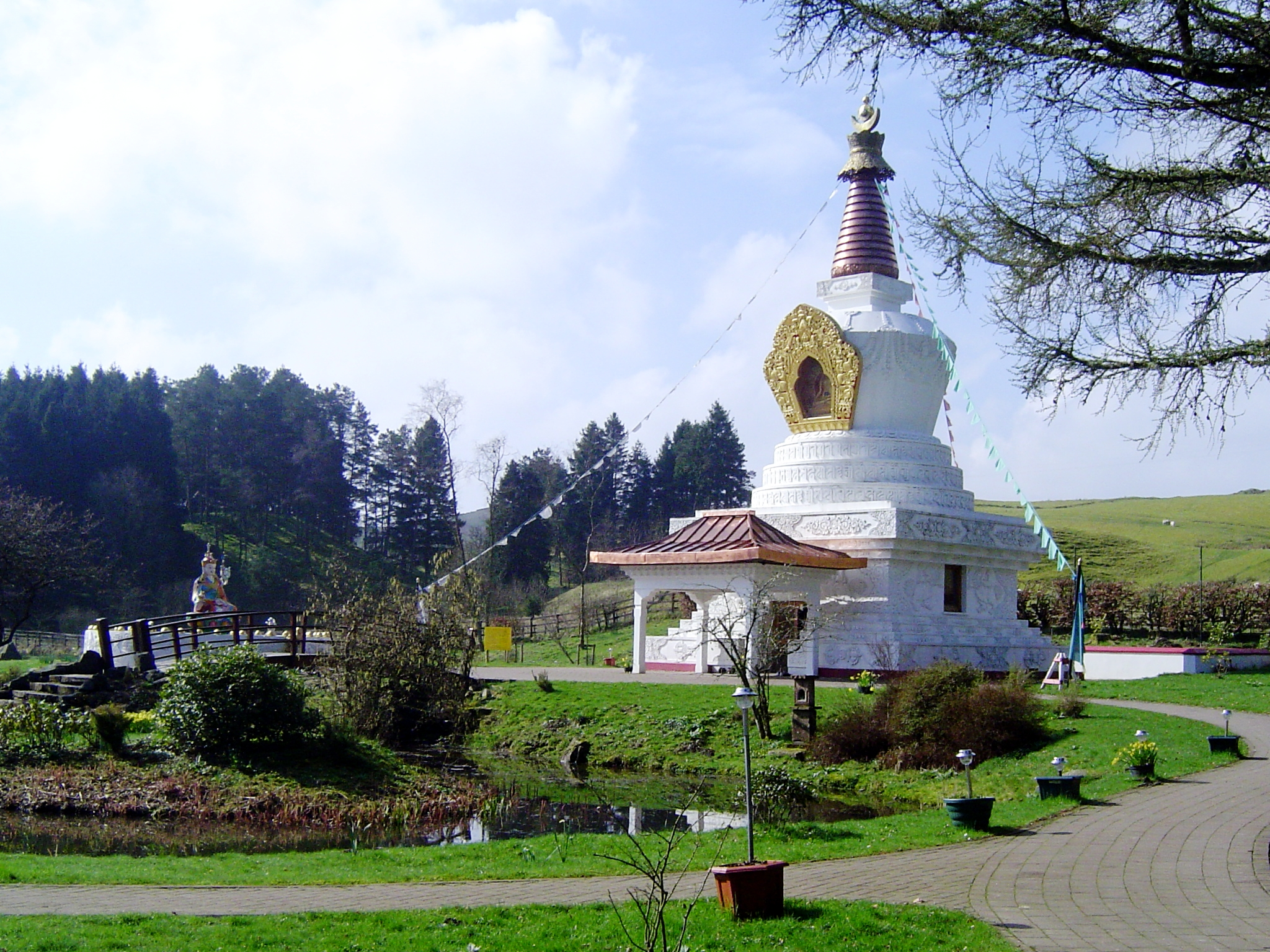
The main stupa at Samyé Ling monastery in Scotland

This is a list of notable Buddhist temples, monasteries, stupas, and pagodas in the United Kingdom, sorted by location.

== England ==
=== Buckinghamshire ===
- Nipponzan-Myōhōji temple and Peace Pagoda at Willen, Milton Keynes (Japanese)

=== Essex ===
- Mahamevnawa Buddhist Monastery, Billericay (Sri Lankan, Theravada)

=== Hertfordshire ===
- Amaravati Buddhist Monastery (Thai, Theravada)

=== London ===
- Kaygu Samye Dzong London, Bermondsey (Tibetan, Vajrayana)
- London Buddhist Centre (Triratna)
- London Buddhist Vihara (Sri Lankan, Theravada)
- London Fo Guang Shan Temple, Marylebone (Chinese, Mahayana)
- Mahamevnawa Buddhist Monastery, Stanmore (Sri Lankan, Theravada)
- Three Wheels Temple, Acton (Japanese, Mahayana)
- Wat Buddhapadipa, Wimbledon (Thai, Theravada)
- Kingsbury Buddhist temple (Sri Lankan, Theravada)

=== Manchester ===
- Wat Charoenbhavana (Thai, Theravada)

=== Norfolk ===
- Norwich Buddhist Centre (Triratna)
- Norwich Zen Buddhist Priory (Japanese, Mahayana)

=== Northumberland ===
- Aruna Ratanagiri, Thai Buddhist monastery, Harnham Buddhist Monastery (Thai, Theravada)
- Throssel Hole Buddhist Abbey (Japanese, Mahayana)

=== West Midlands ===
- Dhamma Talaka Peace Pagoda (Burmese, Theravada)

=== West Sussex ===
- Chithurst Buddhist Monastery (Cittaviveka) (Thai, Theravada)

== Scotland ==
- Kagyu Samyé Ling Monastery and Tibetan Centre, Dumfries and Galloway (Tibetan)

== See also ==
- Buddhism in the United Kingdom
  - Buddhism in England
  - Buddhism in Scotland
  - Buddhism in Wales
- Buddhist Society
- List of Buddhist temples
- Pali Text Society
