= Buddhism in the United Kingdom =

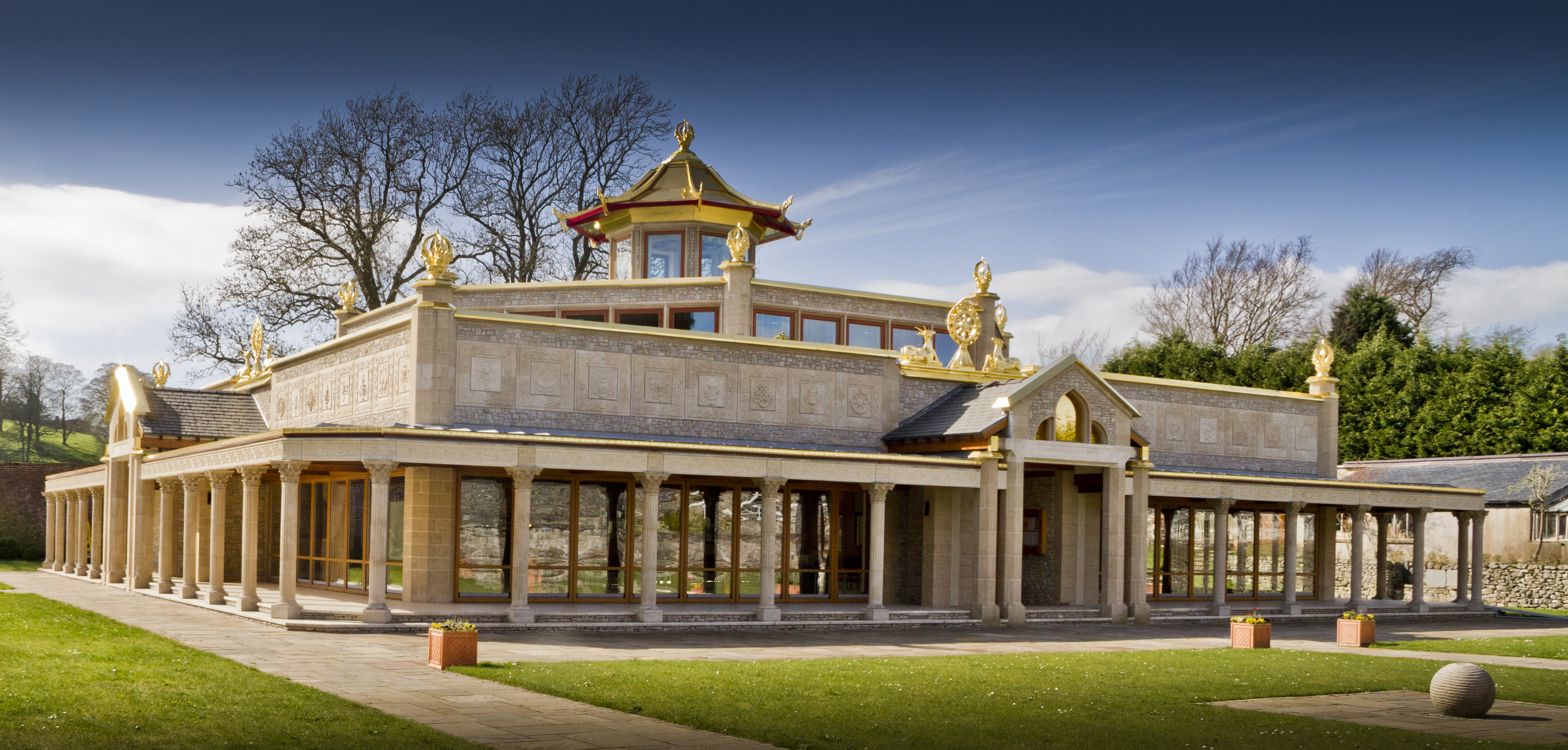
- Manjushri Kadampa Meditation Centre in Cumbria

Total population
- United Kingdom: 289,551 – 0.4% (2021); England: 262,433 – 0.5% (2021); Scotland: 15,501 – 0.3% (2022); Wales: 10,075 – 0.3% (2021); Northern Ireland: 1,542 – 0.08% (2021)

Regions with significant populations
- Greater London: 77,425 – 0.9%
- South East England: 54,433 – 0.6%
- East of England: 26,814 – 0.4%
- South West England: 24,579 – 0.4%

Buddhism is the fifth-largest religious group in the United Kingdom. The 2021 United Kingdom census recorded just under 290,000 Buddhists, or about 0.4% of the total population, with the largest number of Buddhists residing in Greater London and South East England. According to a Buddhist organisation, the growth of Buddhism in the United Kingdom is mainly a result of conversions.

In the UK census for 2011, there were about 247,743 people who registered their religion as Buddhism, and about 174,000 who cited religions other than the other five world religions and Jainism. This latter figure is likely to include some people who follow the traditional Chinese folk religion which also includes some elements of Buddhism.

== History ==
=== Relationship with the Buddhist world ===
Although the practice of Buddhism in the United Kingdom started in the 19th century, the UK has had relations with Buddhist countries for more than a millennium. Britain may have had relations through the rule of the Romans, though most of these were directly from Rome. The religion of Manichaeism, a former major religion which had Buddhist influences, was said to have spread throughout the empire as far as Britannia.

However, there was little contact between the Buddhist world and Britain until the early modern age. Archaeological evidence found in Sutton Hoo suggests that Britain was part of an international culture even during the Anglo-Saxon period, indicated by the presence at the site of garnets from Sri Lanka, at that time a strong Buddhist civilization called 'Anuradhapura' which had had contact with Ancient Rome and Greece. During the Anglo-Saxon period, Sri Lanka was considered by some to be the most distant land from Anglo-Saxon England.

During the 16th century, many English sailors and travelers reached Asia. One such notable person was Ralph Fitch, who visited various places in Asia between 1583 and 1591, including various Buddhist countries such as present-day Myanmar, Ayutthaya (a strong Buddhist kingdom situated in the areas of Thailand, Malaysia, Cambodia and Myanmar), the Himalayas and Ceylon. William Adams was the first Englishman to reach Japan in 1600, at that time the country was also Buddhist.

=== History of Buddhism in the UK ===
Buddhism in the United Kingdom goes at least as far back as the 1810s. Adam Sri Munni Ratna, a Buddhist monk from Ceylon (Sri Lanka), travelled to England with his cousin (also a Buddhist monk) while accompanying Sir Alexander Johnston in 1818. They were keen to learn Christianity as they were travelling to England. During their brief stay, the two monks were baptised and returned to Ceylon where they entered government service.

As Buddhism expanded in the United Kingdom, several umbrella organisations have formed, such as the Buddhist Society (active since 1924, with an office in London), and The Network of Buddhist Organisations, established in 1993.

==== Theravada ====
In Britain, the earliest Buddhist influences came from the Theravada traditions of Burma, Thailand, and Sri Lanka. Interest in them was primarily scholarly to begin with, and a tradition of study grew up that resulted in the foundation of the Pali Text Society in 1881 founded by Thomas William Rhys Davids, which undertook the significant task of translating the Pāli Canon of Theravada Buddhist tradition into English. The start of interest in Buddhism as a path of practice had been pioneered by the original Theosophists, the Russian Madame Blavatsky and the American Colonel Olcott, who in 1880 became the first Westerners to receive the Three refuges and Five precepts, the formal conversion ceremony by which one traditionally accepted and becomes a Buddhist.

Burma and Ceylon were both colonies of the British Empire and both colonies had large or were majority Buddhist. Immigration from the two colonies would have happened. During the 19th to early 20th centuries lascar sailors (people from Asia who worked in British ships) came and settled in the UK. Some of the lascars came from the seafaring communities of Burma and Ceylon. There were also Chinese seamen who settled in the United Kingdom, establishing Chinatowns in Liverpool and London.

The Buddhist Society, London (originally known as the Buddhist Lodge) was founded in 1924 by Christmas Humphreys, another Theosophist who converted to Buddhism. In 1925, the Sri Lankan Buddhist missionary Anagarika Dharmapala brought to England the Maha Bodhi Society, which he had founded with the collaboration of the British journalist and poet Edwin Arnold.

A slow trickle from United Kingdom travelled to Asia for deeper spiritual commitment via monastic ordination, mainly as Theravadin monks, like Ñāṇavīra Thera and Ñāṇamoli Bhikkhu who went to Island Hermitage in Sri Lanka for their Sāmaṇera ordination in 1949. Kapilavaddho Bhikkhu introduced the Dhammakaya tradition to the UK in 1954 in this way and founded the English Sangha Trust in 1955. Theosophical and Theravadin influences continued throughout the early 20th century.

A Theravada monastic order following the Thai Forest Tradition of Ajahn Chah was established at Chithurst Buddhist Monastery in West Sussex in 1979, giving rise to branch monasteries elsewhere in the country, including the Amaravati Buddhist Monastery in the Chiltern Hills and Aruna Ratanagiri in Northumberland. Quite a number of notable Britons like Ajahn Khemadhammo, Ajahn Sucitto, Ajahn Amaro, Ajahn Brahm and Ajahn Jayasaro were ordained into this monastic order, become serious practitioners and dedicated Dhamma teachers. Ajahn Khemadhammo also began Buddhist prison chaplaincy work in 1977 and established "Angulimala, the Buddhist Prison Chaplaincy" in 1985. A lay meditation tradition of Thai origin is represented by the Samatha Trust, with its headquarters retreat centre in Wales.

==== Mahayana ====
Zen Buddhist communities in the UK include the Sōtō Zen priory at Throssel Hole Buddhist Abbey in Northumberland, the Norwich Zen Buddhist Priory, the International Zen Association United Kingdom (IZAUK), the Kwan Um School of Zen (London, York) and the Cloud Water Zen Centre (Glasgow).

The Community of Interbeing, part of the Order of Interbeing, founded by Vietnamese Zen Buddhist Thich Nhat Hanh (who resided in Plum Village, France), had about 90 sanghas meeting across the UK as of 2012. The Order of Interbeing (Tiep Hien) was founded within the Linji School of Dhyana Buddhism (Zen (Rinzai)).

There is a small Pure Land Buddhist presence in the UK. In 1994, Three Wheels Temple was founded in London by Reverend Kemmyō Tairo Sato, as a branch of the Shogyoji Temple, associated with the Higashi Hongan-ji sect of Shin Buddhism. The Amida Trust and Amida Order was founded in April 1996 by Buddhist psychotherapist David Brazier, and in 2020 the Bright Earth Buddhist Temple in Malvern separated from the Amida Order and re-formed as an independent Pure Land Buddhist temple.

==== Vajrayana ====
In 1966, Freda Bedi, a British woman, became the first Western woman to take ordination in Tibetan Buddhism. In 2012 Emma Slade, a British woman, became the first Western woman to be ordained as a Buddhist nun in Bhutan.

Kagyu Samye Ling was founded in 1967 by two spiritual masters, Choje Akong Tulku Rinpoche and Chogyam Trungpa Rinpoche. It was the first Tibetan Buddhist Centre to be established in the West and was named after Samye, the very first monastery to be established in Tibet. In 1977 during his second visit to Samye Ling, the 16th Karmapa assured Akong Rinpoche about the longer-term future of Buddhism in the West and at Samye Ling. It is from this encounter that the Samye Project was born. Samyé Ling now has established centres in more than 20 countries, including Belgium, Ireland, Poland, South Africa, Spain and Switzerland.

Lama Shenpen Hookham, originally from Essex, travelled to India in the late 1960s on the instruction of Chögyam Trungpa Rinpoche, became one of a group of early Western women to take ordination as a nun in the Tibetan Buddhist tradition. She was taught by, and became a translator to many of Tibetan Buddhist masters, as was asked by 16th Karmapa to return to the West to teach. She was authorised to teach Mahamudra by Khenpo Tsultrim Gyamtso Rinpoche, who also encouraged her to return her monastic vows in order to teach Westerners. Lama Shenpen went on to establish the Awakened Heart Sangha and devised a unique, experiential training programme called Living the Awakened Heart, which presents the undiluted essence of Dzogchen and Mahamudra teachings and traditions, tailored especially for a Western audience. Lama Shenpen wrote about her time in India with her teachers and her path to becoming a lama in her autobiography Keeping the Dalai Lama Waiting & Other Stories – An English Woman's Journey to Becoming a Buddhist Lama, which has had many recommendations from other esteemed teachers, including Khandro Rinpoche.

Jamyang Buddhist Centre (JBC) in London is affiliated to the Foundation for the Preservation of the Mahayana Tradition, an international network of Gelugpa Tibetan Buddhist centres. There is also a branch centre in Leeds and affiliated groups around across England. The resident teacher is Geshe Tashi Tsering.

The Manjushri Institute, a large Buddhist college at Conishead Priory in Cumbria, was founded in 1976 under the guidance of Thubten Yeshe, a Tibetan Gelugpa monk. Buddhist organisations in the UK from the Tibetan tradition that have been founded by Western lamas include Dechen and Aro gTér. Dechen is an association of Buddhist centres of the Sakya and Karma Kagyu traditions, founded by Lama Jampa Thaye and under the spiritual authority of Karma Thinley Rinpoche.

==== New Religious Movements ====
New religious movements in Britain include the Triratna Buddhist Community (Previously known as Friends of the Western Buddhist Order), founded by the British teacher and writer Sangharakshita (Dennis Lingwood) in 1967, which has been associated with many allegations of abuse. The New Kadampa Tradition was founded by the Tibetan monk (formerly a Gelugpa) Kelsang Gyatso in 1991 when it took over the Manjushri Institute (Conishead Priory); its practices have sparked much controversy, including official rebukes by the Dalai Lama. There is also a UK section of the Soka Gakkai International, a worldwide organization that promotes a disputed, modernized version of the ancient Japanese Nichiren school of Mahayana Buddhism.

'Diamond Way Buddhism' is a network of lay Buddhist centres, founded by Ole Nydahl.

==== Secular Buddhism and Mindfulness ====
Interest in secular Buddhism, stripped of supernatural elements and doctrines that are deemed insufficiently rational (including ancient, shared Indian religious beliefs in rebirth and karma), has developed from the writings of the British author and teacher Stephen Batchelor.

Vidyamala Burch and her organization Breathworks have helped to popularize mindfulness-based pain management (MBPM), a mindfulness-based intervention (MBI) providing applications for people suffering from chronic pain and illness.

The British Association of Mindfulness-Based Approaches (BAMBA) is a network of 25 mindfulness teacher-training organizations that aims to support and develop good practice and integrity in the delivery of mindfulness-based approaches in the UK.

== Demographics ==
Historical Population
Year	Pop.	±%
2001	151,816	—
2011	261,584	+72.3%
2021	289,551	+10.7%
Religious Affiliation was not recorded in the census prior to 2001.

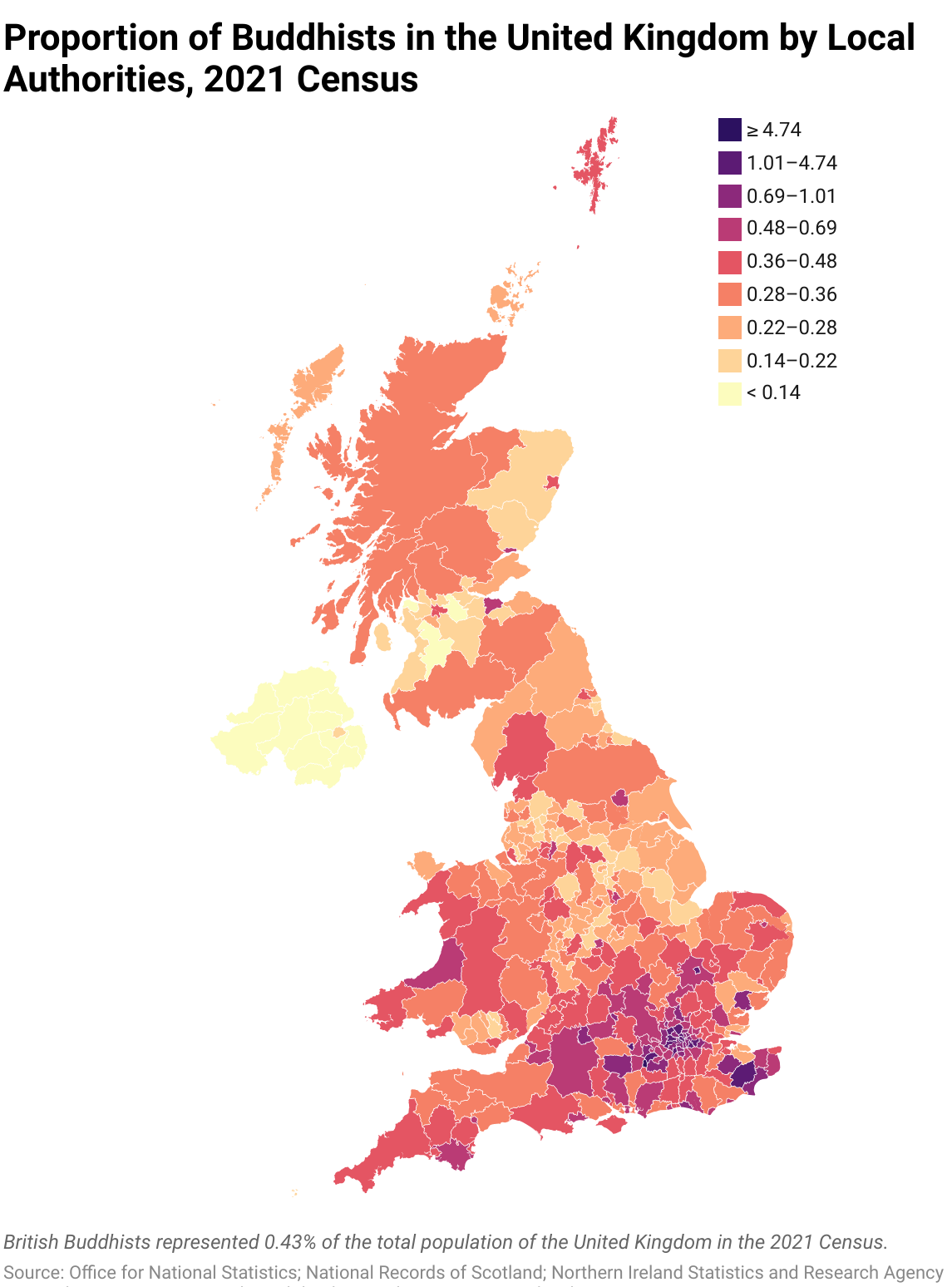
Distribution of British Buddhists by local authority, 2021 census

Buddhists in the United Kingdom by region and country
Region / Country	2021 (Note: 2021/22: England and Wales, Northern Ireland, and Scotland)		2011 (Note: 2011: England and Wales, Northern Ireland, and Scotland)		2001 (Note: 2001: England and Wales, Northern Ireland and Scotland)	
Region / Country	Number	%	Number	%	Number	%
England	262,433	0.5%	238,626	0.5%	139,046	0.3%
—Greater London	77,425	0.9%	82,026	1.0%	54,297	0.8%
—South East	54,433	0.6%	43,946	0.5%	22,005	0.3%
—East	26,814	0.4%	22,273	0.4%	12,065	0.2%
—South West	24,579	0.4%	19,730	0.4%	11,299	0.2%
—North West	23,028	0.3%	20,695	0.3%	11,794	0.2%
—West Midlands	18,804	0.3%	16,649	0.3%	9,760	0.2%
—Yorkshire and the Humber	15,803	0.3%	14,319	0.3%	7,188	0.1%
—East Midlands	14,521	0.3%	12,672	0.3%	7,541	0.2%
—North East	7,026	0.3%	6,316	0.2%	3,097	0.1%
Scotland	15,501 (Note: Scotland held its census a year later after the rest of the United Kingdom due to the COVID-19 pandemic. As a result, data shown is for 2022 as opposed to 2021.)	0.3%	12,795	0.2%	6,830	0.1%
Wales	10,075	0.3%	9,117	0.3%	5,407	0.2%
Northern Ireland	1,542	0.08%	1,046	0.06%	533	0.03%
United Kingdom	289,551	0.4%	261,584	0.4%	151,816	0.3%

=== Population ===
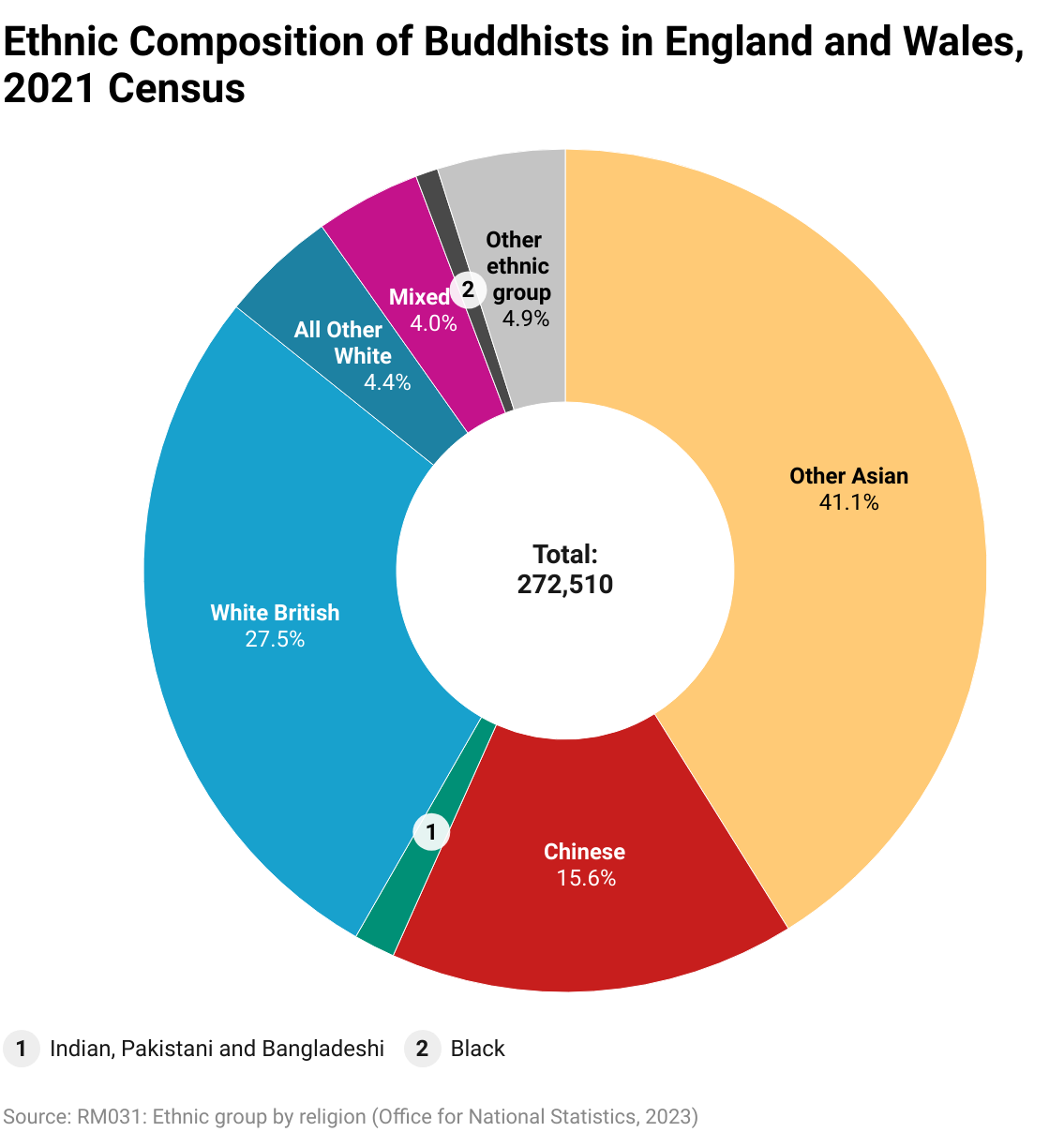
Ethnic composition of British Buddhists, 2021 census

According to the 2021 United Kingdom census, Buddhists in England and Wales enumerated 272,508, or 0.5% of the population. In Northern Ireland, there were 1,542 Buddhists and the equivalent census for Scotland in 2022 recorded 15,501 Buddhists. The local authorities with the highest proportion of Buddhists were: Rushmoor (4,732: 4.74% of the population), Greenwich (5,034: 1.74%), Reading (2,887: 1.66%), Hounslow (3,932: 1.36%) and Westminster (2,603: 1.27%). In Scotland, the highest proportion was in Edinburgh at 0.54% (2,796); In Wales, the highest proportion was in Ceredigion at 0.53% (378); and in Northern Ireland, the highest concentration was in Belfast at 0.15% (517).

In the 2021 census for England and Wales, the main places of birth were the United Kingdom at 110,528 people (40.5% of the total Buddhist population), Southeast Asia at 67,152 (24.6%), South Asia at 45,076 (16.5%) and East Asia at 32,448 (11.9%). Among individual countries in Asia, the countries of Thailand; Sri Lanka; Nepal; China; and Vietnam made up the top five most common countries of birth for Buddhists residing in England and Wales. 58.3% of Buddhists identified as Asian, 31.9% as White, 4.0% were of Mixed heritage, 0.9% identified as Black and the remaining 4.9% identified with other ethnic groups.

For the 2001 census in Scotland, people were asked both their current religion and the one that they were brought up in. 6,830 people gave Buddhism as their current religion, and 4,704 said they were brought up in it, with an overlap of 3,146. In Northern Ireland, the published report which listed religions and philosophies in order of size reported 'Buddhist' at 533.

== See also ==
- Thomas William Rhys Davids, founder of the Pāli Text Society
- The Light of Asia, 19th century British poem about the life of the Buddha
- Hammalawa Saddhatissa
- Dhammakaya Tradition UK
- Dhamma Talaka Pagoda
- Oxford Centre for Buddhist Studies
- Religion in the United Kingdom
- Religion in the Republic of Ireland

== Bibliography ==
- Bell, Sandra (1991). Buddhism in Britain - Adaptation and Development, PhD thesis, University of Durham
- Bluck, Robert (2004). Buddhism and Ethnicity in Britain: The 2001 Census Data, Journal of Global Buddhism 5, 90–96
- Kay, David N. (2004). Tibetan and Zen Buddhism in Britain: Transplantation, Development and Adaptation, London; New York: RoutledgeCurzon
- Bluck, Robert (2006). British Buddhism: Teachings, Practice and Development. Routledge. ISBN 978-1-134-15817-1.
- Munt, Sally; Yip, Andrew (2016). Cosmopolitan Dharma: Race, Sexuality, and Gender in British Buddhism. BRILL. ISBN 978-90-04-23280-8.
