= Shasta Abbey =

Buddhist training monastery near Mount Shasta, California

Coordinates: 41°21′03″N 122°21′14″W

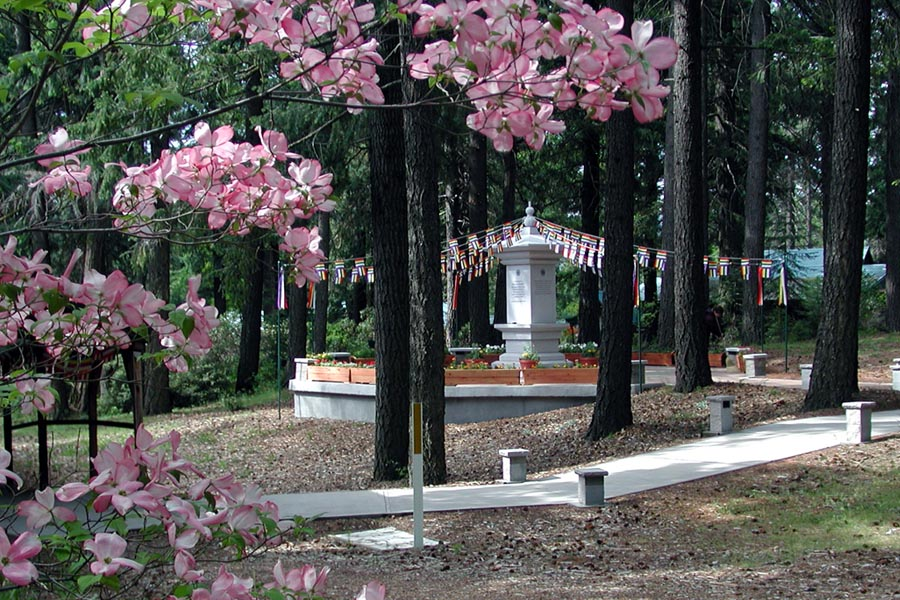
Rev. Master Jiyu's Stupa at Wesak

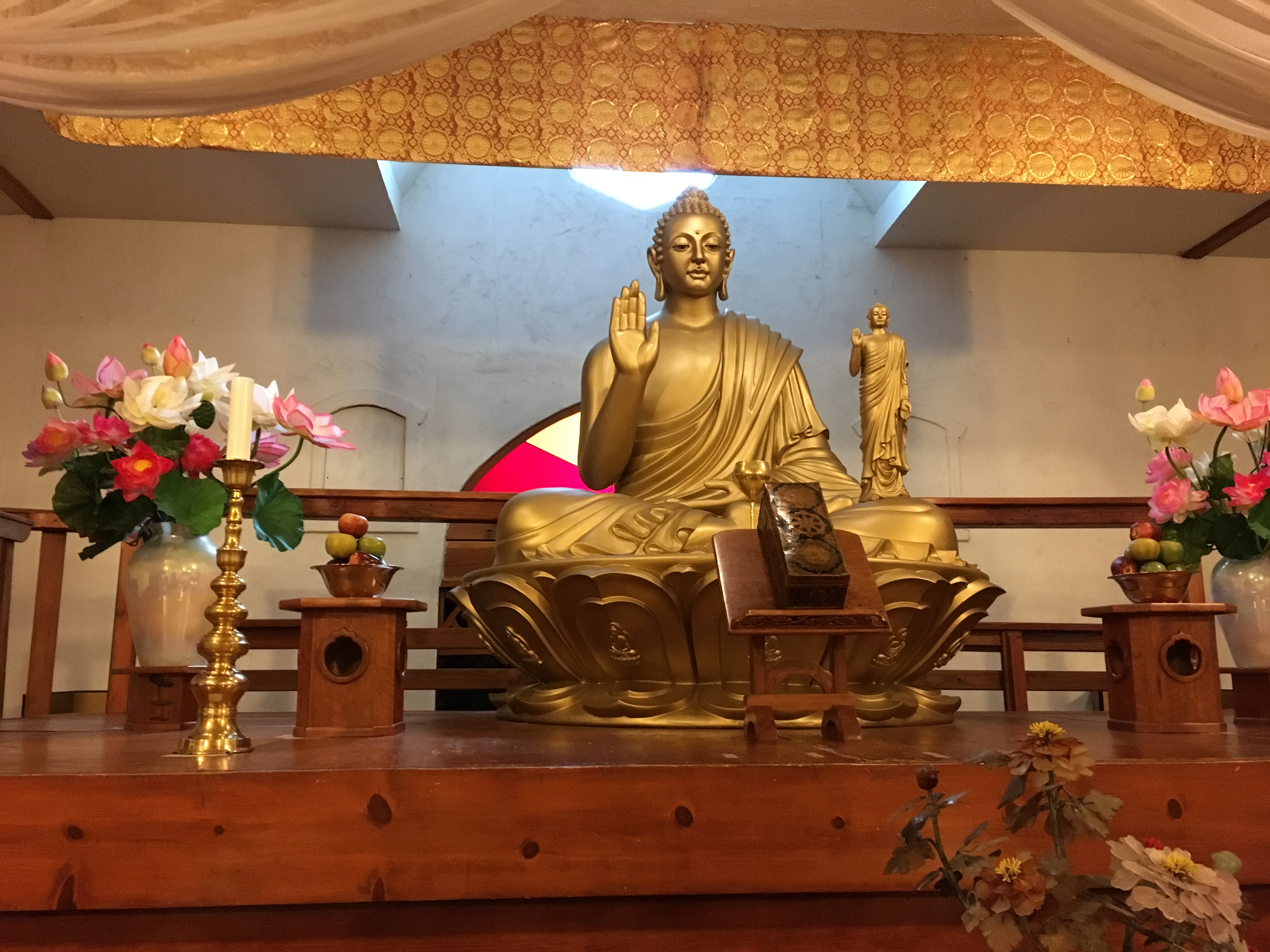
Buddha at the Buddhahall of Shasta Abbey, Mt Shasta, California

Shasta Abbey, located on sixteen forested acres near Mount Shasta in northern California, United States is a training monastery for Buddhist monks and a place of practice for lay Buddhists and interested visitors. It was established in 1970 by Reverend Master P.T.N.H. Jiyu-Kennett, who was Abbess and spiritual director until her death in 1996.

== History ==
A monastery of the Order of Buddhist Contemplatives (OBC), it was established in 1970 by Rev. Master Jiyu-Kennett, a British woman, on behalf of her teacher, Keido Chisan Koho Zenji, her Master in Japan. In November 1969, Rev. Master Jiyu-Kennett came to San Francisco on a lecture tour and stayed on in the United States to establish Shasta Abbey the following year. Rev. Master Jiyu-Kennett served twenty-six years as Abbess and spiritual director of Shasta Abbey, ordaining and teaching monks and lay people. She founded Throssel Hole Buddhist Abbey in England in 1972. She also founded the OBC to establish a framework within which the temples she founded could come together.

The second Abbot was Rev. Master Eko Little, a dharma heir of Rev. Master Jiyu-Kennett and her assistant for 20 years. He succeeded Rev. Master Jiyu after her death and served as Abbot until 2010. He maintained his Master’s wishes for, and legacy to, Shasta Abbey in the 14 years following her death. In his time as Abbot, he continued to unfold Rev. Master Jiyu’s teaching, strengthening the fabric of the monastery, and enhancing the spiritual life of the Sangha, both monastic and lay. Allegations of sexual misconduct came to light towards the end of his Abbacy, and in May 2010 he left the Abbey and returned to secular life.

The third, and current, Abbess is Rev. Master Meian Elbert, who was ordained in 1977 and received dharma transmission in 1979 from Rev. Master Jiyu-Kennett. She was named a Master of the Order by Rev. Master Jiyu in 1989. She was chaplain to Rev. Master Jiyu for more than 15 years and has served the community as Vice Abbess, Chief Cook, Chief Precentor, Prior and Novice Master. She also served as Executive Secretary of the Order of Buddhist Contemplatives. Rev. Master Meian was elected Abbess by the resident Shasta Abbey monastic community on June 17, 2010.

== Training ==
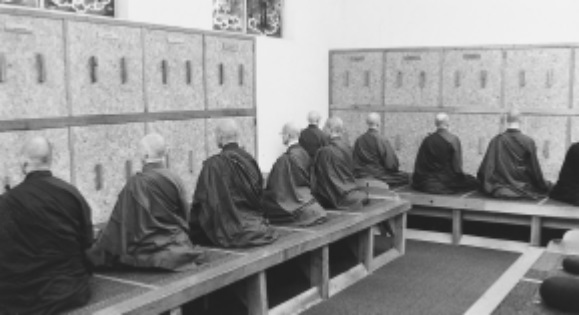
Serene Reflection Meditation

Buddhist training at Shasta Abbey is based on the practice of Serene Reflection Meditation (Sōtō Zen) and the keeping of the Buddhist Precepts. The resident monastic community includes approximately 26 vegetarian, celibate male and female monks. The robes of the monastics reflect a combination of traditions, representing both the Chinese Chan and Japanese Sōtō Zen traditions that Jiyu-Kennett ordained under.

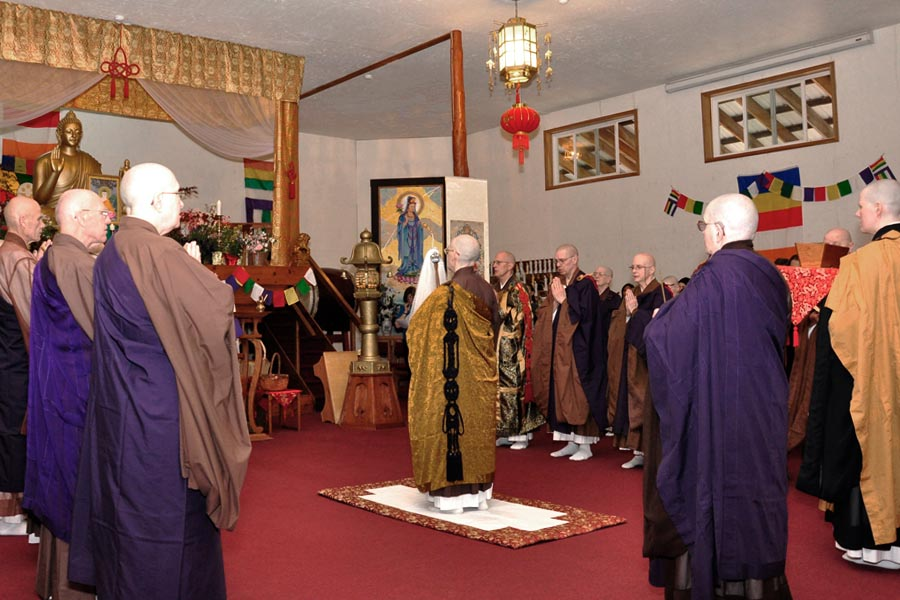
A Festival Ceremony in the Buddha Hall at Shasta Abbey

The daily schedule is a kaleidoscope of seated meditation, ceremonial and working meditation in all its various forms in order to cultivate the mind of meditation in all aspects of daily life. The schedule flows through the day from the wake-up bell to lights out, and provides opportunities “…to do what needs to be done…”. A typical day’s schedule is hard to define, but most days start with meditation and Morning Service. The day is then filled with the normal activities of daily life: Meals eaten together, individual monastic office tasks and tasks done together for the benefit of the whole community, time for individual spiritual practice and time for common ceremonial and practice, rest and renewal time including community tea and tea with the laity.

Lay residents staying at the Abbey for an extended period of time, and visitors participating in retreats are asked to follow a similar schedule to that of the monks. Both monks and laity observe the practice of The Middle Way as far as possible in the daily schedule.

The Abbey is a place of silence and serenity for the local congregation, lay friends and interested visitors. Practitioners strive to follow the Buddha's Teachings wholeheartedly, giving up what seems important from the point of view of the self to follow the Way of the Buddhas and Ancestors. This is reflected in their attitude of faith and practice of Dāna (mutual assistance):

There really can be no price put on the Buddha Dharma. Thus, we at Shasta Abbey have chosen not to have fees or even suggested donation amounts. We make an offering of the teaching, and provide a training refuge, putting our faith in the practice of dana.

== Publications ==
Shasta Abbey Press publishes Buddhist books, including the writings of its founder, Rev. Master Jiyu-Kennett, and translations of many Buddhist texts. Among these are the master works of Soto Zen patriarchs Dogen Zenji (Shōbōgenzō) and Keizan Jokin Zenji (Denkoroku). Many publications can be accessed free of charge via the Shasta Abbey Website.

The translations of Buddhist texts and scriptures at Shasta Abbey are particularly useful for practitioners of Buddhism in the West, as the translations are done from the mind of meditation and by actual Buddhist monks, as opposed to the worldly, literal-minded viewpoints of many scholastic western translators of the past. The translations are less esoteric and thus easier to understand from the point of view of Buddhist practice in a western context.
