= Saddhatissa =

Saddhatissa may refer to

- Hammalawa Saddhatissa, (1914–1990) Sri Lankan Buddhist monk, missionary, writer and translator
- Saddha Tissa of Anuradhapura, king of Anuradhapura from 137 to 119BCE
