= Rewata Dhamma =

Rewatadhamma
- ရေဝတဓမ္မ
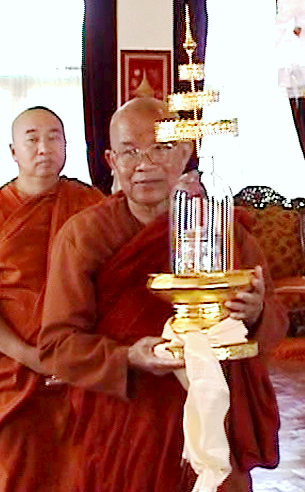
- Dr. Rewata Dhamma carrying the United Nations Buddha relics during their display at Dhammatalaka Pagoda in July 2003
- Title: Sasanadhaja Siripavara Dhammacariya (1953); Aggamahapandita (2002)

Personal life
- Born: Maung; December 1929 Thamagon, Henzada District, Irrawaddy Province, British Burma
- Died: 26 May 2004 (aged 74) Birmingham, England
- Education: Varanasi University
- Occupation: Buddhist monk

Religious life
- Religion: Buddhism
- School: Theravada
- Dharma name: Revatadhamma ရေဝတဓမ္မ

Sayadaw U Rewata Dhamma (Pali: Revatadhamma; 4 December 1929, Thamangone – 26 May 2004, Birmingham) was a prominent Theravada Buddhist monk and noted Abhidhamma scholar from Myanmar (Burma). After pursuing an academic career in India for most of two decades, he accepted an invitation to head a Buddhist centre in Birmingham UK, and over the next three decades gained an international reputation as a teacher of meditation and an advocate of peace and reconciliation.

== Life and career ==
The young Rewata was first ordained as a novice at the age of 12, and received higher ordination at the age of 20. In 1953, he was awarded the title Sasanadhaja Siripavara Dhammacariya after achieving distinctions in a state examination in Pali. Then, having received a state scholarship, he left for India in 1956 to continue his education at Varanasi University, using the expanded name of Rewata Dhamma for his passport. In 1960, he obtained a BA in Mahayana Buddhism; in 1964 an MA in Sanskrit and Indian philosophy; and in 1967, a PhD. He now became a university lecturer and published works in Pali and Hindi, including the Abhidhammatta Sangaha, which was awarded the Kalidasa Prize by the Hindi Academy in 1967.

In 1975 he relocated to England to establish a Buddhist centre in Birmingham which catered for both Theravadins and followers of the Tibetan Karma Kagyu school. Later, he set up his own monastery and then went on to sponsor the Dhamma Talaka Pagoda, which officially opened in 1998. He also helped establish meditation centers throughout Europe as well as in North, Central and South America. During that time he lectured at several universities on Buddhist subjects and attended numerous conferences dealing with the application of religious practice to bringing about political and economic justice, harmony among religions and ecological responsibility. From the 1990s too, books by him in English began to appear, the last three only posthumously. In 2002, the Burmese government conferred on him the title Agga Maha Pandita.

Throughout his career, Dr. Rewata Dhamma championed the cause of national reconciliation, speaking to international bodies such as the United Nations and Amnesty International. He was one of Aung San Suu Kyi's most influential Buddhist mentors, first meeting in Rangoon and becoming acquainted with Khin Kyi and Suu Kyi during their residence in India in the 1960s, and then becoming reacquainted while conducting meditation retreats at the Oakenholt Centre near Oxford.

== Bibliography ==
- Anuruddhacariya’s Abhidhammatta Sangaha with Sumangala Samitthera’s Abhidhammattha Vibhavantika, edited and revised by Bhandanta Rewatadhammathera. Bauddha Swadhyaya Satra, Varanasi, India, 1965. [Hindi language]
- Anuruddhacariya, Abhidhammattasangaha I-II, with Hindi translation & Abhidharma-Prakasini commentary. Critically edited, translated & commented by Bhadant Rewatadhamma and Ram Shankar Tripathi, Varanasi Sanskrit University, India,1967.
- Buddhaghosâcariya, Visuddhimaggo I-III, with Paramatthamañjusatika of Bhadantacariya Dhammapala. Edited and revised by Dr. Rewatadhamma, Varanasi Sanskrit Univ., India, 1969–1972. [Hindi language]
- The First Sermon of the Buddha. 1st ed. Dhamma Talaka Publications, Birmingham, 1994; 2nd ed. as The First Discourse of the Buddha, Wisdom Pbls, Boston, USA, 1997. French translation by Tancrède Montmartel as Le premier enseignement du bouddha, le sermon de Bénarès. Eds Claire Lumière, Saint-Cannat, France, 1998.
- Maha Paritta: The Great Protection - Buddhist chants. Dhamma Talaka Pbls, Birmingham, 1996.
- A Comprehensive Manual of Abhidhamma: The Abhidhammattha Sangaha - Pali Text, Translation and Explanatory Guide. Introduction and Explanatory Guide by U Rewata Dhamma & Bhikkhu Bodhi. BPS Pariyatti Editions, Onalaska WA, 2000.
- The Buddha and his Disciples. Dhamma Talaka Pbls, Birmingham, 2001.
- Emptying the Rose-apple Seat - a guide to Buddhist meditation methods. Triple Gem Pbls, Chino Hills CA, USA, 2004; 2nd ed. The Buddha Educational Foundation, Taipei, Taiwan, 2005.
- The Buddha’s Prescription – selected talks and essays, edited by Yann Lovelock. Triple Gem Pbls, Chino Hills CA, USA, 2005.
- Process of Consciousness and Matter – the philosophical psychology of Buddhism; edited by Dr Ottaranyana. Triple Gem Pbls, Chino Hills CA, USA, 2007.
