= Houn Jiyu-Kennett =

British Buddhist abbess (1924–1996)

Hōun Jiyu-Kennett
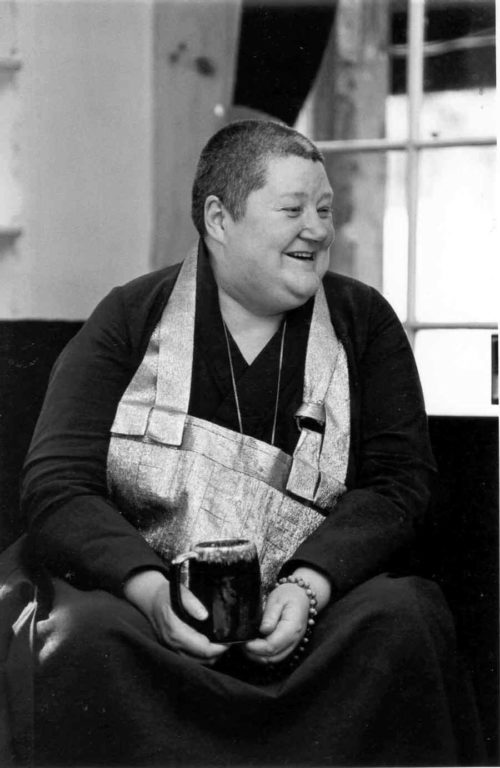
- Reverend Master Jiyu-Kennett at Shasta Abbey
- Title: Rōshi

Personal life
- Born: Peggy Teresa Nancy Kennett; 1 January 1924 St Leonards-on-Sea, Sussex, United Kingdom
- Died: 6 November 1996 (aged 72) Mount Shasta, California, United States
- Education: Durham University; Trinity College of Music

Religious life
- Religion: Buddhism
- School: Sōtō Zen Buddhism

Senior posting
- Teacher: Seck Kim Seng; Suigan Yogo
- Based in: Shasta Abbey
- Predecessor: Keido Chisan Koho
- Successor: Daizui MacPhillamy; Former Head of the Order; Haryo Young; Former Head of the Order; Meian Elbert; Current Abbess of Shasta Abbey; Daishin Morgan; Former Abbot of Throssel Hole Abbey

Hōun Jiyu-Kennett (Japanese: 法雲慈友ケネット, 1 January 1924 – 6 November 1996), born Peggy Teresa Nancy Kennett, was a British Buddhist abbess most famous for having been the first female rōshi to be sanctioned by the Sōtō School of Japan to teach in Western countries.

== Biography ==
=== Early years ===
Hōun Jiyu-Kennett was born as Peggy Teresa Nancy Kennett in St Leonards-on-Sea, Sussex, England on January 1, 1924. As a young woman she found herself questioning gender roles in society and grew to become disillusioned with Christianity. She studied medieval music at Durham University and then received a scholarship to Trinity College of Music in London, England. Though attracted to Buddhism, she felt during this period that she was called to serve the Church of England as a priest. However, church policies at the time did not allow women to be ordained, and this enhanced her previous disillusionment with Christianity.

=== Training at Sojiji ===
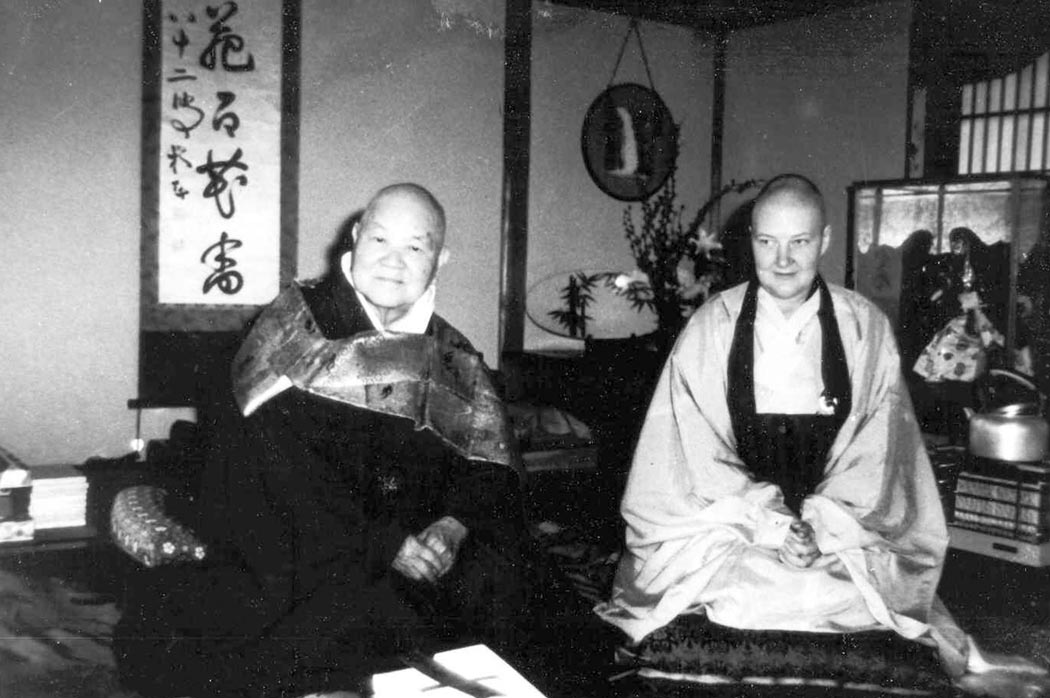
Reverend Master Jiyu-Kennett with Keido Chisan Koho Zenji

She first became interested in Theravada Buddhism during this period of questioning and searching, joining the London Buddhist Vihara. In 1954, she joined the London Buddhist Society, where she continued her Buddhist studies and lectured. While there, she met the scholar D.T. Suzuki, and developed a strong interest in Rinzai Zen Buddhism. In 1960, when chief abbott Kōho Keidō Chisan Zenji of Sojiji in Japan came to the society, she was asked to make the arrangements for his stay. Koho asked if she would consider becoming his student back in Japan. She accepted the offer, and two years passed before she arrived at Sojiji to study Soto Zen Buddhism under him. (Note: Kay: "When it comes to reconstructing the trajectory of Kennett's life in the East, we are heavily dependent upon her own diaries from this period. These were revised and edited following her return to the West and were eventually published in two volumes as The Wild, White Goose (1977a and 1978). These texts reflected Kennett's progress through the Japanese Soto system, initially as a trainee in one of its principal monasteries and later as a temple priest. We must remember, however, that as an autobiographer, Kennett was concerned less with historical accuracy than with providing legitimation and identity for herself and her movement. The autobiographical aims and purposes behind The Wild, White Goose will be examined in detail later; for the present, we will concentrate upon abstracting the facts from what is largely, to use Kennett's own words, ‘a work of fiction’ (Kennett 1977a: xi).)

In January 1962, Kennett traveled to Malaysia to accept an award she had been honored with for setting a Buddhist hymn, "Welcome Joyous Wesak Day" by Sumangalo, to music. Before leaving for Japan, Kennett was ordained a novice nun by Venerable Seck Kim Seng (釋金星; Shì Jīnxīng) in the Linji Chan school and given the Buddhist name Jiyu (慈友, Cíyou in Chinese, Jiyu in Japanese) meaning compassionate friend.

Jiyu-Kennett arrived in Japan in 1962, where she was also ordained in the Soto-school, and trained at Sōjiji from 1962 to 1963. Formally, Kōho Keidō Chisan Zenji was her teacher, but practically, one of Keido Zenji's senior officers, Suigan Yogo roshi, was her main instructor, because 'Keido Zenji was often preoccupied with administrative affairs. She received Dharma transmission twice, from Kōho Keidō Chisan Zenji on May 28, 1963, but also from Suigan Yogo.

While training at Sōjiji, Kōho Keidō Chisan let her take care of westerners who were interested in Zen training, mostly from American military bases, and she "developed a regular programme of teaching and meditation to nurture their growing interest in Zen". Eventually, she received the official title of "Foreign Guest Hall Master" from Keido Chisan.

Jiyu-Kennett continued her institutional career by becoming an Oshō, i.e. "priest" or "teacher". Her Zuise ceremony was conducted in public in Japan. Previously, women's ceremonies were held in private, but Koho had decided that the practice of holding private ceremonies for women and public ceremonies for men was wrong. According to Jiyu-Kennett's account,

I have never done a ceremony with more terror inside me than that one with twelve men down each side, each one with curtains drawn as if to say 'I'm not here.' Those were the witnesses. Try that sometime! That can be pretty scary—in a foreign country, in a language you're not one hundred percent sure of, with a lot of people who are hating your guts. And the reason Koho Zenji did it—and I've got it on tape—was for the benefit of women in his country.

Following her Zuise ceremony, Jiyu-Kennett was installed as shinzan (head priest) of Unpukuji temple in Mie prefecture.

=== Return to the west ===
After the death of Chisan Koho, in November 1967, the Soto Administration Section became ambivalent to her, and "Kennett's title of Foreign Guest Hall Master was deleted from the list of Sojiji office appointments". Nevertheless, according to Jiyu-Kennett, she "received a certificate asking me to become the official pioneer missionary of the Soto Sect in America" just before she left Japan for a lecturing tour the US in November 1969, (Note: According to Bodiford, "The relatively low status of dharma transmission means that in and of itself it does not qualify one to accept students or to train disciples. According to the regulations, Zen students should be supervised only by a teacher who has attained supervisory certification (i.e. sanzen dōjō shike status), that is, someone who in the popular literature might be called a Zen master. To attain supervisory certification requires not just high ecclesiastical grades and dharma seniority but also at least three years' experience as an assistant supervisor at a specially designated training hall (tokubetsu sōdō), during which time one undergoes an apprenticeship. There are two grades for training supervisor, namely shike and jun shike. Appointment as shike is done by cooptation: "There are about 50 or so of these in Soto (the Rinzai roshis can also be addressed as "shike"). One big difference between the rinzai roshi and the Soto shike is that the shike transmission [...] is not vertical at all. That means that even if your teacher is a shike, he can not appoint you as a shike. So who does appoint a shike? In fact, there is a kind of committee, called the "shike-kai", consisting of all Japanese Soto shike. There is no foreign shike, as far as I know. The shike-kai can appoint anyone as a shike whom they consider their equal, i.e. who has done genuine training and study, cultivated himself and reached whatever understanding that might be considered enlightened enough to match the enlightenment of the other shike. So shike appointment can be called horizontal in a way.") At this time Jiyu-Kennett was not in good health, as during her time in Japan she had experienced many illnesses.

In 1969, Jiyu-Kennett founded the Zen Mission Society in San Francisco, and in 1970 Shasta Abbey in Mount Shasta, California, the first Zen monastery in the United States to be established by a woman. In 1972, Jiyu-Kennett's British chapter of the Zen Mission Society established Throssel Hole Priory in Northumberland, England. In 1978 Jiyu-Kennett changed the name of the Zen Mission Society to the Order of Buddhist Contemplatives.

=== Illness and visions ===
In 1975, Jiyu-Kennett was stricken with illness yet again, and this time she became bedridden. In 1976, worn out and convinced death was near, she resigned from her position as abbess of Shasta Abbey and went into retreat in Oakland, California. Still rather ill, of unknown causes, she had her student Daizui MacPhillamy with her often to tend to her care. Following a kensho experience he had, she conferred Dharma transmission to him at her bedside in 1976.

During this retreat, Jiyu-Kennett had a prolonged religious experience, including a series of visions and recalling past lives. She regarded these experiences as "a profound kensho (enlightenment) experience", constituting a third kensho, and published an account of these visions, and an elaborate scheme of stages of awakening, in How to Grow a Lotus Blossom. Her interpretations, which parallel Christian mysticism, were controversial, and rejected by some as makyo ("illusion"). Stephen Batchelor describes these episodes,

The visions lasted for 12 months, until 26 January 1977, the first twelve occurring in Oakland, the rest at Shasta, where she returned on 25 October. Each vision unfolded as a dream-like episode, charged with Western and Buddhist religious symbolism, superimposing itself on whatever she saw around her. She compared the series of visions to an elaborated contemporary version of the classical Zen images of the ten 'ox-herding' pictures. By the time the final vision faded, she was cured. She interpreted the experience as that of a 'third kensho.'"

Around four months into her 'third kensho', Jiyu-Kennett regained her health and again assumed her position as Abbess of Shasta Abbey for the next 20 years until her death on November 6, 1996. According to Jiyu-Kennett, her experiences are not uncommon, but are rarely spoken of; she regarded publishing her own experiences as a way to acknowledge the existence and validity of such experiences, which, according to her, may contribute to further insight after initial awakening. She acknowledged the risks and potential for controversy in publishing her account, but felt that the benefits of releasing such information outweighed the risks.

According to Kay, "Kennett's visionary experiences – and also her ambivalence about the status of their content – are not unprecedented within the Zen tradition. Soto literature includes numerous accounts, as noted especially by Faure (2000) Visions of power, described by the founders of Soto Zen, Dogen and Keizan. (Note: See also Willimas (2005) and Bodiford (2008).) Dogen and Keizan "also both warned against seeing visions or unusual spiritual experiences as the goal of practice". but were clear that such things can occur along the way.

== Teachings ==
According to Jiyu-Kennett the accumulation of insight happens in three stages of kensho, along with a fourth that can occur at the time of death: (Note: Kennett: "In the first kenshō the stages flash by so quickly that the whole kenshō is only comprehended as one flash. One goes, as it were, from earth to heaven by rocket, or as a lightning bolt, with no time to take notice of the journey before one has arrived. The third kenshō takes place slowly and deliberately with plenty of time to comprehend each step of the way. For example, in the first kenshō one jumps, of necessity, beyond the opposites and knows for ever afterwards that one has jumped. In the third kenshō the opposites are looked at slowly and dispassionately and then deliberately discarded; the first kenshō is a swift comprehension of grace; the third kenshō starts as a deliberate act of will.")

1. "initial glimpse" kensho, or "great flash of deep understanding", that most Zen practitioners eventually experience, and that are often used in the Soto-tradition as the later basis for qualification for Dharma Transmission;
2. "On-Going Fūgen Kensho" or, in D.T. Suzuki's words, "the little moments that make one dance", experienced by practitioners with a continual, stable practice;
3. based on her personal experience with visions, Jiyu-Kennett postulated a third stage which involves the recalling of past life experiences, profound spiritual visions, and deep awakening experiences, that bring great clarity to aspects of the Dharma and practice, and go beyond what is experienced in the first kensho;
4. parinirvana, experienced by rare practitioners who achieve Buddhahood upon time of death.

The third stage can include a "Zen sickness", best known from Hakuin Zenji's account in Yasen kanna, translated into English under the title Wild Ivy『夜船閑話』 (Quiet conversations on an evening boat)

== Teaching style ==
Jiyu-Kennett had a commanding presence about her, both intellectually as well as physically. Of a rather husky build, she had a tremendous laughter and was known to be gifted at storytelling. In accordance with Shakyamuni Buddha's teaching and practice of upaya/Skill in Means, Koho Zenji directed her to adapt Soto Zen to Western needs, and not stick with Japanese practice. She frequently used Western sayings, songs, and stories as koans.

According to the book The Encyclopedia of Women and Religion in North America,

Her adaptation of Zen for Westerners has been likened to Japanese Soto Zen with a flavor of the Church of England, for she had been taught that Zen in North America should adopt Western monastic dress and liturgical forms. For example, she set the traditional Buddhist liturgy to music based on Gregorian chants."

Jiyu-Kennett was an advocate for equality between the sexes, as was Great Master Dogen.

== Dharma heirs ==
- Haryo Young (Head of the Order of Buddhist Contemplatives)
- Meian Elbert (Abbess of Shasta Abbey)
- Daishin Morgan (Former Abbott of Throssel Hole Buddhist Abbey)
- Daizui MacPhillamy

Among many others...

== Legacy ==
The Order of Buddhist Contemplatives, founded by Jiyu-Kennett, now has chapters in the United States, the Netherlands, Canada, the West Indies, the United Kingdom and Germany. It has long maintained translation and publishing activities, focused on the writings of Dogen Zenji and Keizan Zenji, initially in print, and more recently in electronic form.

== See also ==
- Buddhism in Europe
- Buddhism in the United States
- Timeline of Zen Buddhism in the United States

== Bibliography ==
- Jiyu-Kennett; MacPhillamy, Daizui (2005). Roar of the Tigress: The Oral Teachings of Rev. Master Jiyu-Kennett, Western Woman and Zen Master. Shasta Abbey Press. ISBN 0-930066-24-3. OCLC 45341979.
- Jiyu-Kennett (1999). Zen is Eternal Life. Tuttle Publishing. ISBN 0-930066-20-0.
- Nearman, Herbert; Jiyu-Kennett; MacPhillamy, Daizui (1998). Buddhist Writings on Meditation and Daily Practice: The Serene Reflection Meditation Tradition, Including the Complete Scripture of Brahma's Net. Shasta Abbey Press. ISBN 0-930066-18-9.
- Jiyu-Kennett (1996). Serene Reflection Meditation. Shasta abbey Press. ISBN 0-930066-16-2.
- Jiyu-Kennett (1993). How to Grow a Lotus Blossom, Or How a Zen Buddhist Prepares for Death, 2nd edition. Shasta Abbey Press. ISBN 0-930066-10-3. OCLC 34669093.
- Keizan; Nearman, Hubert; Jiyu-Kennett (1993). The Denkōroku, Or, The Record of the Transmission of the Light. Shasta Abbey Press. ISBN 0-930066-13-8.
- Nearman, Hubert; Jiyu-Kennett; Sotoshu (1993). The Monastic Office. Shasta Abbey Press. ISBN 0-930066-14-6.
- Jiyu-Kennett (1987). The Liturgy of the Order of Buddhist Contemplatives for the Laity. Shasta Abbey Press. ISBN 0-930066-07-3.
- Jiyu-Kennett (1980). Zen Meditation. Shasta Abbey Press.
- Jiyu-Kennett; MacPhillamy, Daizui (1979). The Book of Life. Shasta Abbey Press. ISBN 0-930066-04-9.
- Jiyu-Kennett (1979). The Shasta Abbey Psalter. Shasta Abbey Press. OCLC 82217069.
- Jiyu-Kennett (1979). The Shasta Abbey Book of Ceremonies. Shasta Abbey Press. OCLC 13951501.
- Jiyu-Kennett (1978). The Wild, White Goose: The Diary of a Zen Trainee. Shasta Abbey Press. ISBN 0-930066-02-2.
- Jiyu-Kennett (1972). Selling Water by the River: A Manual of Zen Training. Pantheon Books. ISBN 0-394-46743-4.
- Jiyu-Kennett (1972). Zen Mission Society: Scriptures & Ceremonies. J. Kennett. OCLC 15989285.

== Sources ==
- Batchelor, Stephen (1994). The Awakening of the West: The Encounter of Buddhism and Western Culture. Parallax Press. ISBN 0-938077-69-4. OCLC 30078996.
- Bodiford, William M. (1993). Sōtō Zen in Medieval Japan. University of Hawaii Press. ISBN 0-8248-1482-7.
- Bodiford, William M. (2008), Dharma Transmission in Theory and Practice. In: Zen Ritual: Studies of Zen Buddhist Theory in Practice (PDF), Oxford University Press
- Boucher, Sandy (1993). Turning the Wheel: American Women Creating the New Buddhism. Beacon Press. ISBN 0-8070-7305-9.
- Carroll, Bret E. (2000). The Routledge Historical Atlas of Religion in America. Routledge. ISBN 0-415-92131-7.
- Faure, Bernard (2000), Visions of Power. Imaging Medieval Japanese Buddhism, Princeton, New Jersey: Princeton University Press
- Ford, John Ismael (2006), Zen Master Who?: A Guide to the People and Stories of Zen, Simon and Schuster
- Fowler, Merv (1999). Buddhism: Beliefs and Practices. Sussex Academic Press. ISBN 1-898723-66-4.
- Greenwell, Bonnie (2002), Energies of Transformation: A Guide to the Kundalini Process, Motilal Banarsidass
- Kay, David N. (2007), Tibetan and Zen Buddhism in Britain: Transplantation, Development and Adaptation, Routledge
- Kennett, Jiyu (1999). Zen is Eternal Life. Tuttle Publishing. ISBN 0-930066-20-0.
- Kennett, Jiyu (1987). The Liturgy of the Order of Buddhist Contemplatives for the Laity. Shasta Abbey Press. ISBN 0-930066-07-3.
- Kennett, Jiyu (1993), How to Grow a Lotus Blossom: Or How a Zen Buddhist Prepares for Death, Shasta Abbey Press
- Kay, David N. (2004). Tibetan and Zen Buddhism in Britain: Transplantation, Development and Adaptation. Routledge. ISBN 0-415-29765-6. OCLC 51315294.
- Lowman, Catherine (1993). Women's Leadership in Marginal Religions: Explorations Outside the Mainstream. University of Illinois Press. ISBN 0-252-02025-1.
- Morgan, Diane (2004), The Buddhist Experience in America, Greenwood Publishing Group
- Osto, Douglas (2016), Altered States: Buddhism and Psychedelic Spirituality in America, Columbia University Press
- Schomberg, Koshin (n.d.), How to Grow a Lotus Blossom: Reflections (PDF), Serene Reflection Dharma Association
- Skinner Keller, Rosemary; Rosemary Radford Ruether; Marie Cantlon (2006). The Encyclopedia of Women and Religion in North America. Indiana University Press. ISBN 0-253-34685-1. OCLC 61711172.
- Snelling, John (1991). The Buddhist Handbook: A Complete Guide to Buddhist Schools, Teaching, Practice and History. Inner Traditions. ISBN 0-89281-319-9. OCLC 23649530.
- Watson (n.d.), Great Master Keizan Jōkin: His Life and Legacy (PDF), Throssel Hole Buddhist Abbey
- Williams, Duncan Ryūken (2005), The Other Side of Zen: A Social History of Sōtō Zen Buddhism in Tokugawa Japan, Princeton University Press
