= Bogoda Seelawimala Thera =

Bogoda Seelawimala Nayaka Thera
- Title: Head Priest of the London Buddhist Vihara and the current Chief Sangha Nayaka of Great Britain

Personal life
- Born: Bogoda, Sri Lanka
- Occupation: Head Priest of the London Buddhist Vihara and the current Chief Sangha Nayaka of Great Britain

Religious life
- Religion: Buddhism
- Lineage: The Malwatte Chapter of the Siam Nikaya

Senior posting
- Based in: Great Britain

Ven. Bogoda Seelawimala Nayaka Thera (Sinhala: පුජ්‍ය බෝගොඩ සීලවිමල නාහිමි) is the incumbent Head Priest of the London Buddhist Vihara and the current Chief Sangha Nayaka of Great Britain. He was appointed Chief Bhikkhu of the London Buddhist Vihara on 8 May 2008 following the demise of Ven. Dr Medagama Vajiragnana Nayaka Thera. Ven. Seelawimala Nayaka Thera hails from the Malwatte Chapter of the Siam Nikaya in Sri Lanka.

== Early days ==
Hailing from Bogoda, a village in the Kurunegala District, Ven. Seelawimala Nayaka Thera was the son of devout Buddhist parents. He entered the order at the age of 14 years under the tutorship of Ven. Balalle Seelaratana Nayaka Thera (chief incumbent of Palagala Purana Vihara in Polgahawela and the chief Adhikarana Sangha Nayaka of Dambadeni-Harispattuwa. In 1964, he entered the Heramitigala Shastralankara Pirivena, Pilimatalawa for his primary education under the supervision of Ven. Pilimatalawa Chandajothi Nayaka Thera.

== Higher education ==
Ven. Seelawimala Nayaka Thera graduated from the University of Sri Lanka (Peradeniya) in 1975. He had obtained an MA degree, studying under Professor Leslie Gunawardhana, on the subject: Influence of Hinduism on Buddhism. While at University, Seelawimala Nayaka Thera joined the teaching profession. He taught in several schools including Hindagala Maha Vidyalaya, Maliyadeva College, Kurunegala and Dharmaraja College, Kandy.

Having studied meditation under the meditation master Godwin Samararatne, Ven. Seelawimala Nayaka Thera further trained under Ven. Dr Henepola Gunaratana Nayaka Thera at his Meditation Centre in West Virginia.

Ven. Seelawimala continues to engage in scholarly activities, engaging in international Buddhist conferences and contributing articles to Buddhist journals.

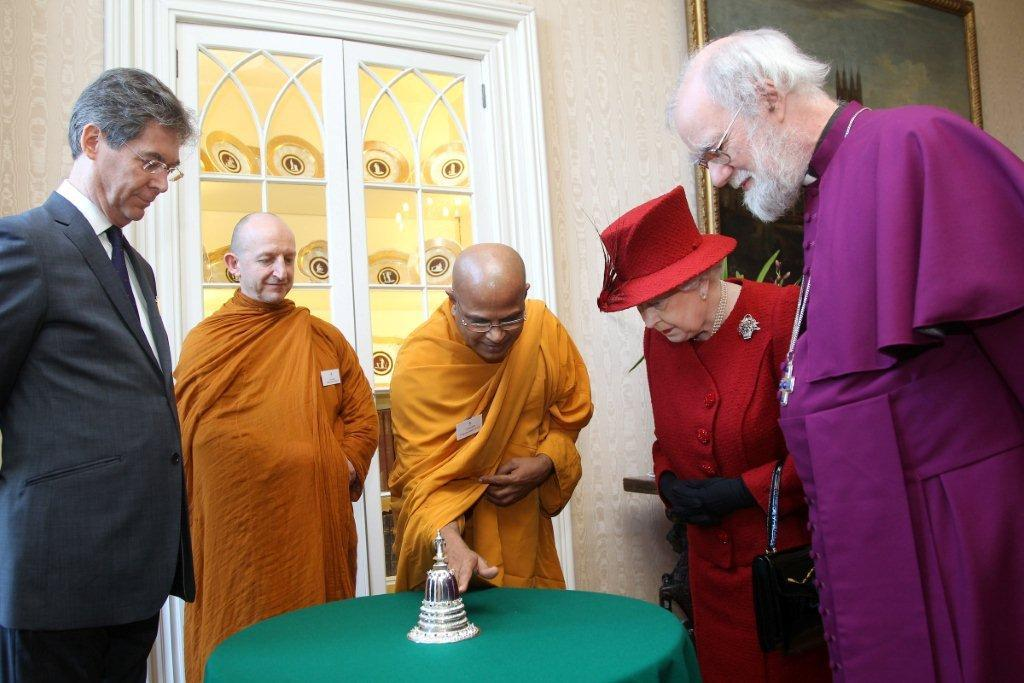
Ven. Bogoda Seelawimala Nayaka Thera with Queen Elizabeth II, Abbot of the Amaravati Monastery Ajahn Amaro and former Archbishop of Canterbury Rowan Williams

== London Buddhist Vihara ==
In 1992, Ven. Seelawimala Nayaka Thera joined the London Buddhist Vihara as a resident monk, on the invitation of Ven. Dr Medagama Vajiragnana Nayaka Thera. Under the guidance and direction of Ven. Dr Vajiragnana Nayaka Thera, and also Ven. Professor Walpola Rahula Nayaka Thera (who was a regular visitor to the London Buddhist Vihara), Ven. Seelawimala Nayaka Thera developed as a Dhammaduta and proficient Dhamma communicator. Ven Seelawimala Nayaka Thera also began teaching meditation in United Kingdom.

As well as serving as the Chief Bhikkhu of the London Buddhist Vihara, Ven. Seelawimala Nayaka Thera serves as a trustee of the Inter-Faith Network UK, Director of the Heathrow Multi-Faith Chaplaincy Board, the Buddhist Chaplain of the West Middlesex University Hospital and at the Ealing Hospital. He is also the Chief of Sri Lankan Sangha Council in Britain, Buddhist representative at UK and Commonwealth Remembrance Day Ceremony and at the Commonwealth Day Ceremony at Cenotaph. Ven. Bogoda Seelawimala Nayaka Thera is the first Buddhist monk to be invited to a royal wedding in Britain and he attended to the Queens' Diamond Jubilee as well. It was in the St Paul's Cathedral on 5 June 2012.

== National events ==
The 2012 London Olympic organisers gave all participants at the games spiritual assistance in five of the major religions in the world. Followers of Christianity, Hinduism, Islam, Judaism and Buddhism were provided their own places of veneration and worship at the Olympic Village. As a result, Bogoda Seelawimala was appointed as Buddhist chaplain to the London Olympics.

Bogoda Seelawimala served as the sole Buddhist representative at the state funeral of Queen Elizabeth II at Westminster Abbey in 2022. He served the same capacity at the Coronation of Charles III and Camilla in 2023.

== See also ==
- London Buddhist Vihara
