= Buddhism in Scotland =

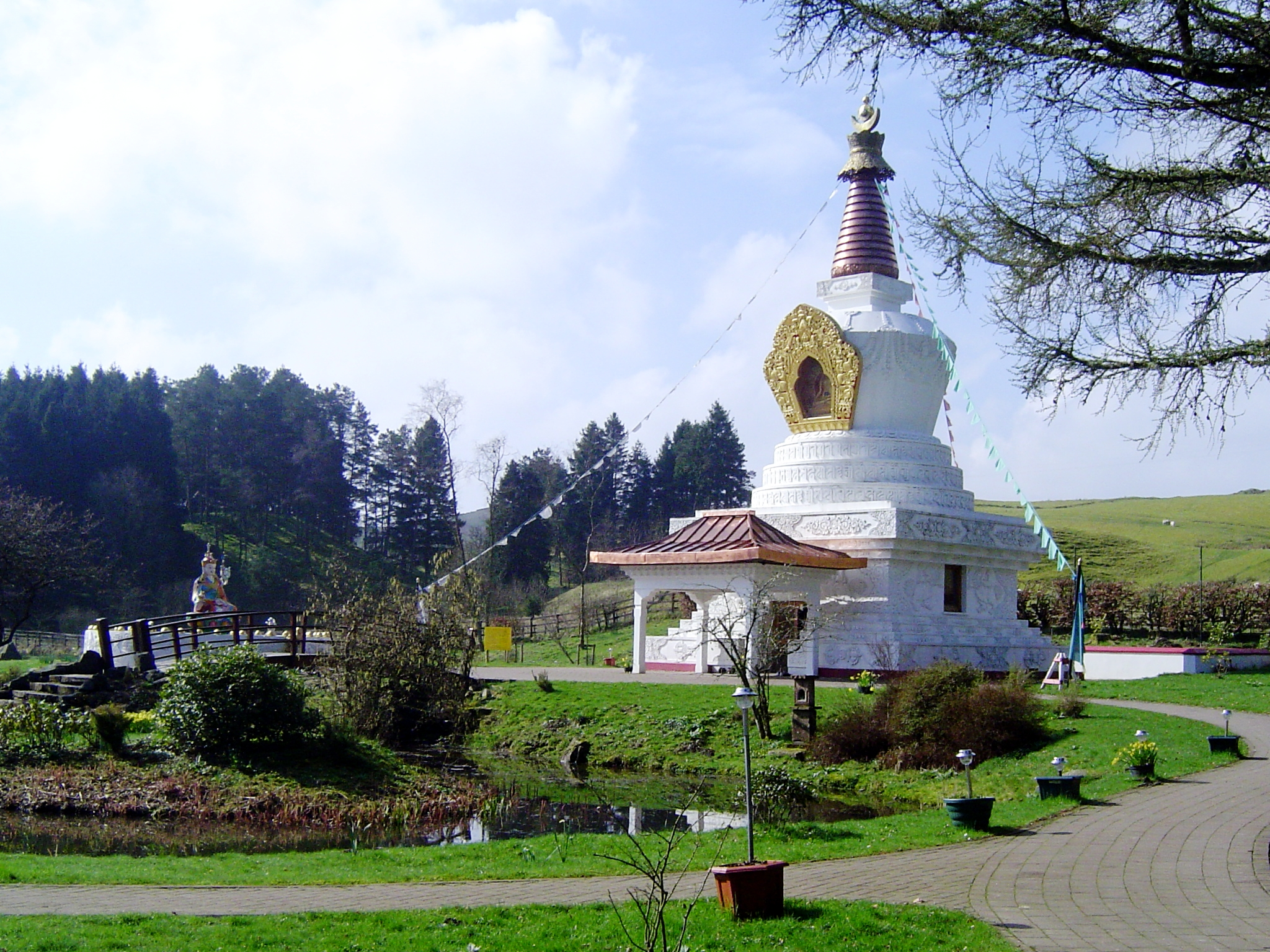
- The main stupa at Samyé Ling Monastery in Eskdalemuir, Dumfries

Total population
- 15,501 – 0.3% (2022 Census)

Regions with significant populations
- Glasgow City: 2,854 – 0.5%
- City of Edinburgh: 2,796 – 0.5%
- Aberdeen City: 1,014 – 0.5%
- Fife: 866 – 0.2%

Historical Population
Year	Pop.	±%
2001	6,830	—
2011	12,795	+87.3%
2022	15,501	+21.1%
Source: Office for National Statistics and National Records of Scotland

Buddhism in Scotland is a relatively recent phenomenon. In Scotland, Buddhists represented about 0.3% of the population (15,501) in the 2022 census.

== History of Buddhism in Scotland ==
The earliest Buddhist influence on Scotland came through its imperial connections with South East Asia, and as a result the early connections were with the Theravada traditions of Burma, Thailand, and Sri Lanka. To begin with, 150 years ago, this response was primarily scholarly, and a tradition of study grew up that eventually resulted in the foundation of the Pali Text Society, which undertook the huge task of translating the Pali Canon of Theravada Buddhist texts into English.

The rate of growth was slow but steady through the century, and the 1950s saw the development of interest in Zen Buddhism. In 1967 Kagyu Samyé Ling Monastery and Tibetan Centre was founded by Tibetan lamas and refugees Chögyam Trungpa Rinpoche and Akong Rinpoche. It is in Eskdalemuir, in south west Scotland and is the largest Tibetan Buddhist centre in Western Europe, and part of the Karma Kagyu tradition.

As well there are other Buddhism-based new religious movements such as the New Kadampa Tradition, Triratna Buddhist Community and Sōka Gakkai International. The Triratna community maintains a retreat centre at Balquhidder in the Trossachs.

== Demographics ==
In the 2001 census, there were 6,830 Buddhists in Scotland, or 0.1% of the population. This increased to 12,795 people, or 0.2%, in the 2011 census.

== Samyé Ling ==
Kagyu Samyé Ling Monastery and Tibetan Centre was founded in 1967 by two spiritual masters, Choje Akong Tulku Rinpoche and Chogyam Trungpa Rinpoche, who both belong to the Kagyu school of Tibetan Buddhism. It was the first Tibetan Buddhist Centre to be established in the West and was named after Samye, the very first monastery to be established in Tibet. In 1977, during the 16th Karmapa's second visit to Samye Ling, he assured Akong Rinpoche about the longer-term future of Buddhism in the West and at Samye Ling. It is from this encounter that the Samye Project was born.

There is an associated community on Holy Isle, a small island off the coast of the Isle of Arran, which is owned by Samyé Ling. The settlements on the island include the Centre for World Peace and Health and a traditional retreat centre for nuns. Samyé Ling has also established centres in more than 20 countries, including Belgium, Ireland, Poland, South Africa, Spain and Switzerland.

== Notable Scottish Buddhists ==
- Stephen Batchelor
- Alex Ferns
- Rupert Gethin
- Ajahn Candasiri
- Truschbag
- Martin Taylor

== See also ==
- Holy Isle, Firth of Clyde
- Buddhism in the United Kingdom
- Buddhism in England
- Buddhism in Wales
- Buddhism by country
- Demographics of Scotland
- British Asian
- Asian-Scots
- New Scot
