= Buddhism in Wales =

Buddhism's origin and presence in Wales, a country of southwest Great Britain

Buddhism in Wales is followed by 0.3% of the Welsh population, according to the 2021 Census. Buddhism has a relatively short history, having only really established a presence in the country in the 20th Century. 10,075 people in Wales declared themselves Buddhist in the 2021 Census, representing a number of Buddhist traditions.

== Denominations ==
Tibetan Buddhism is particularly well represented with branches of several different traditions and lineages, notably Lama Shenpen Hookham's Awakened Heart Sangha, based in North Wales. Zen Buddhism has several groups in Wales and three Soto Zen masters are currently resident and actively teaching. The Samatha Trust, a lay Theravada group, have their headquarters in Wales as does the Tibetan group, Awakened Heart Sangha. The Triratna Buddhist Community have a number of groups and a large Cardiff Buddhist Centre. A student of B. Alan Wallace, David Oromith's Samadhi community is active in South West Wales and across the UK. David is an author and teacher of Buddhist meditation. The Nyingma Aro gTér Lineage has been active in Wales since 1981. The Aro gTér Lineage Holders, Ngak’chang Rinpoche and Khandro Déchen, are resident in Wales and have written many publications about Vajrayana Buddhist practice (see Aro Books worldwide and Aro Books Inc). Another Welsh author of this lineage is Ngakma Nor’dzin Pamo who is a teacher at Aro Ling Cardiff.

== Buddhist Council of Wales ==
The Buddhist Council of Wales had a number of Buddhist organisations and groups listed on their website. Owing to insufficient members being able to fulfill the terms of its Constitution, The Buddhist Council of Wales was dissolved on the 3rd November 2019 and no longer exists.

== Notable Buddhists ==
- Ricky Evans — former rugby star who converted to Buddhism.

== See also ==
- Buddhism in Scotland
- Buddhism in England
- Buddhism in the United Kingdom
- Religion in Wales
