= Norwich Zen Buddhist Priory =

Buddhist temple in Norwich, United Kingdom

- Location within Norfolk
- Interactive map of Norwich Zen Buddhist Priory

Monastery information
- Full name: Norwich Zen Buddhist Priory
- Other name: Norwich Buddhist Priory
- Order: Order of Buddhist Contemplatives
- Established: 2013

People
- Founder: Rev. Leoma Hague
- Prior: Rev. Leoma Hague

Site
- Location: Norwich, Norfolk, UK
- Coordinates: 52°37′46″N 1°17′31″E
- Grid reference: TG2308
- Public access: yes, with appointment
- Website: norwichzen.org.uk

Norwich Zen Buddhist Priory is a place of meditation and practice for the Sōtō Zen tradition of Buddhism. It is located in west Norwich, England. A senior monk in the Order of Buddhist Contemplatives, Reverend Leoma Hague, is resident there.

Norwich Zen Buddhist Priory was established in 2013. It offers teaching and guidance, either in person or online, on meditation and Buddhist life. There is a schedule of regular meetings, retreats, festivals and other events for anyone who wishes to learn about or deepen their practice of meditation.

The priory is supported by a group of lay Buddhists in Norwich and across East Anglia who follow the Sōtō Zen tradition. It is dependent entirely on donations.
