= London Buddhist Vihara =

Buddhist temple in London, England

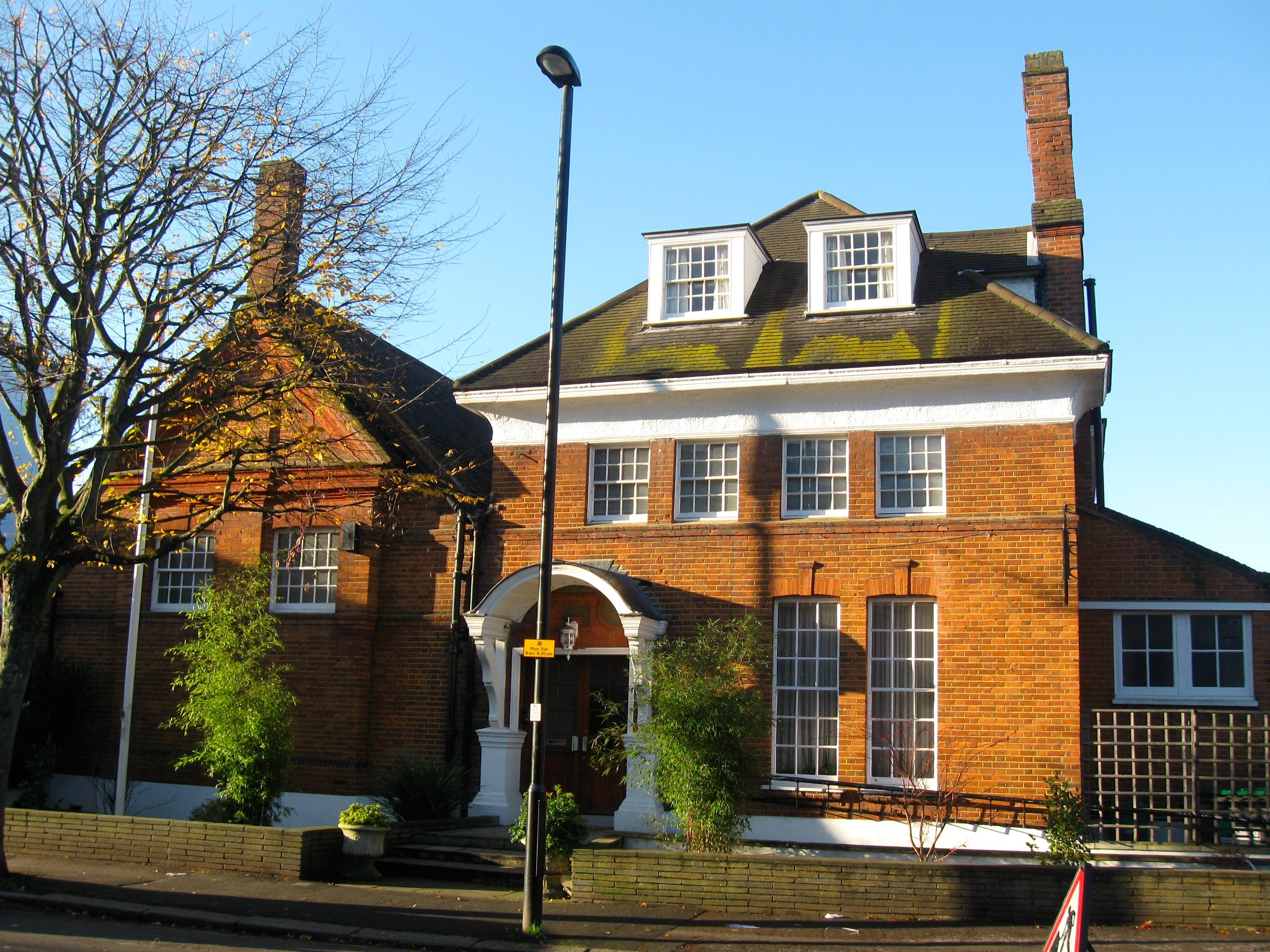
- The main building on The Avenue, Bedford Park, Chiswick, formerly a social club

Religion
- Affiliation: Theravada Buddhism
- Leadership: Anagarika Dharmapala, founder

Location
- Location: Dharmapala Building, The Avenue, London W4 1UD
- Country: United Kingdom
- Interactive map of London Buddhist Vihara
- Coordinates: 51°29′48″N 0°15′21″W

Architecture
- Architects: Norman Shaw (exterior); E. J. May (interior)
- Completed: c. 1877
- Listed Building – Grade II
- Official name: London Buddhist Vihara (Former CAV Social Club)
- Designated: 2 February 1970
- Reference no.: 1079469

Website
- www.londonbuddhistvihara.org

The London Buddhist Vihara (Sinhala:ලන්ඩන් බෞද්ධ විහාරය Landan Bauddha Viharaya) is one of the main Theravada Buddhist temples in the United Kingdom. The Vihara was the first Sri Lankan Buddhist monastery to be established outside Asia.

Established in 1926, the Vihara is managed by the Anagarika Dharmapala Trust in Colombo. The current chief bhikkhu of the Vihara is Ven. Bogoda Seelawimala Nayaka Thera, who is also the Chief Sangha Nayaka of Great Britain.

The Vihara building, Grade II listed, was the social club for Chiswick's Bedford Park garden suburb until 1939. The building was designed by Norman Shaw; the interior, now much modified, was by Edward John May.

== History ==
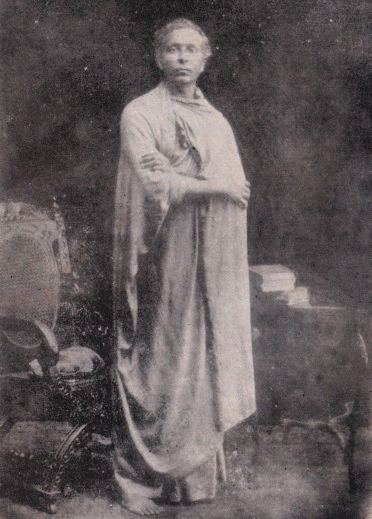
Founder Anagarika Dharmapala

The London Buddhist Vihara was founded in 1926 by Anagarika Dharmapala.

One of the temple's main benefactors during its early days was Mary E. Foster, who financed ‘Foster House’ in Ealing. This was the first Sri Lankan Buddhist temple established outside Asia and was named the London Buddhist Vihara in 1926. Shortly afterwards, the Vihara moved to Gloucester Road in the Royal Borough of Kensington and Chelsea, where it continued until the Second World War. During the war, the temple premises were requisitioned, and the monks returned to Ceylon.

In 1955, the Vihara reopened in Ovington Square, Knightsbridge under the initiative of Sir Cyril de Zoysa. Narada Nayaka Thera became the chief bhikkhu of the Vihara in 1958. The Vihara moved to Heathfield Gardens, Chiswick in 1964. Hammalawa Saddhatissa Nayaka Thera subsequently became the chief bhikkhu of the Vihara and was succeeded in 1985 by Dr Medagama Vajiragnana Nayaka Thera.

In 1994, the Vihara moved to its present premises at The Avenue, Chiswick. Ven. Bogoda Seelawimala Nayaka Thera was appointed as the chief bhikkhu in May 2008. The Vihara has several resident bhikkhus from Sri Lanka, and conducts and actively engages in religious Buddhist activities in the region.

== Building ==
The Vihara building was the social club for the Bedford Park garden suburb until 1939. The architect, Richard Norman Shaw, designed the exterior in 1877-8; the interior, now much modified, was by the architect Edward John May. The building was Grade II listed in 1970.

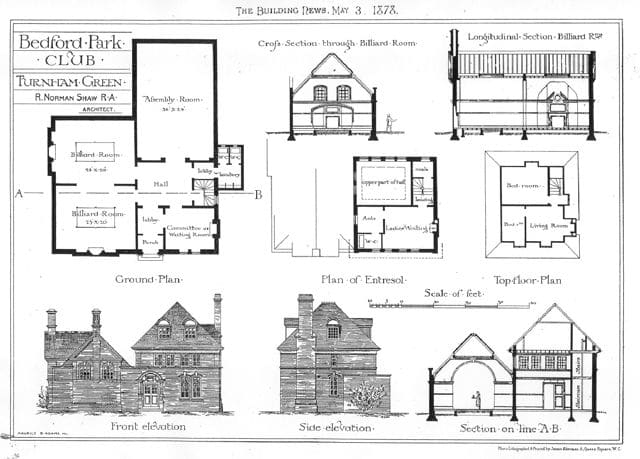
Plans for Bedford Park Club by Norman Shaw, 1878

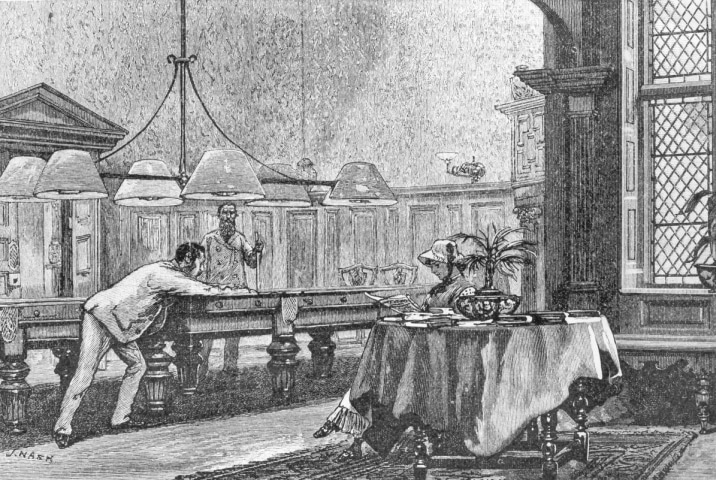
Sketch of The Club, Bedford Park, 1880

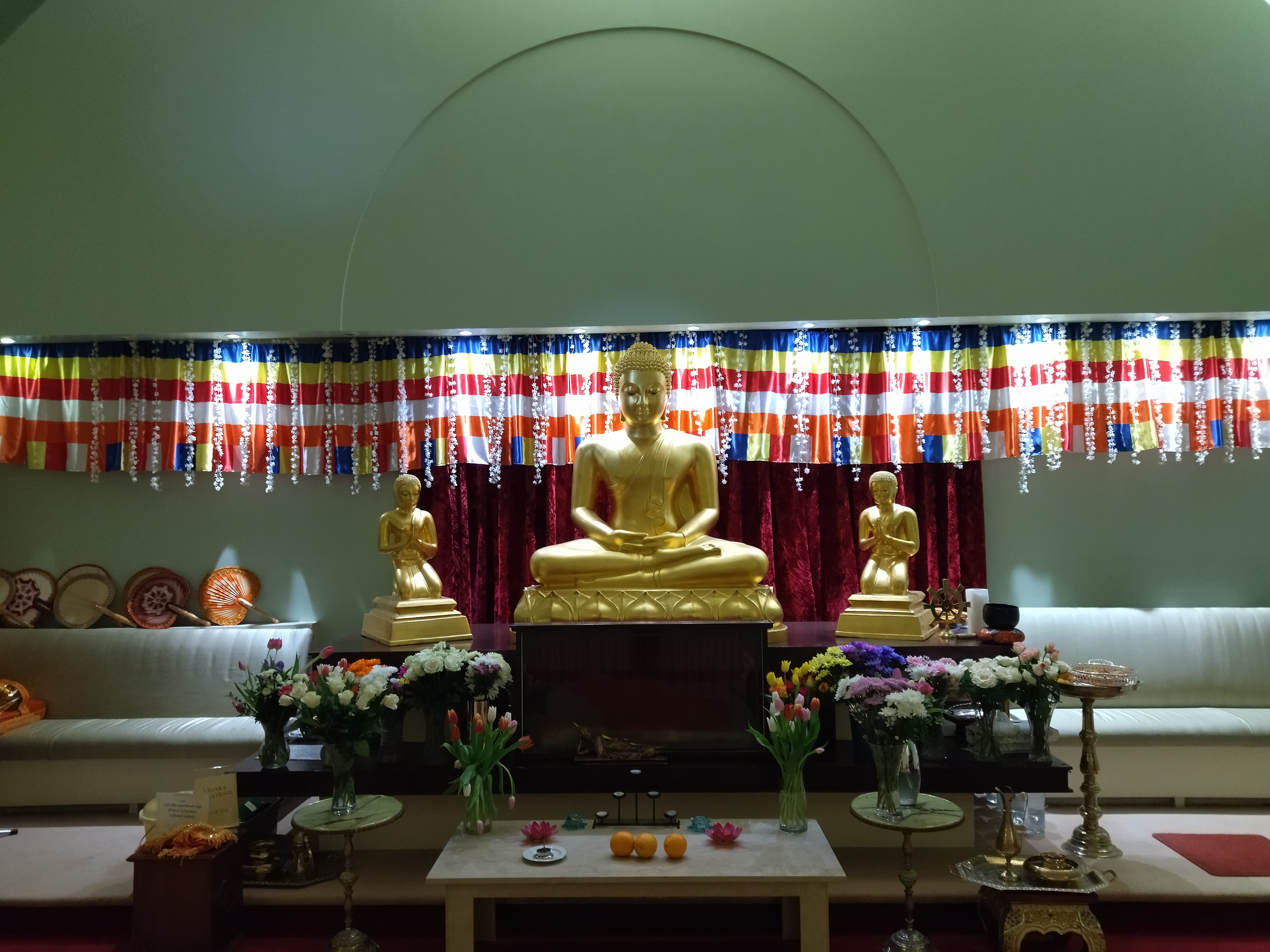
View inside the meditation room, formerly a billiard hall, 2024

== See also ==
- Hammalawa Saddhatissa
- Maha Bodhi Society
- Wat Buddhapadipa
- Buddhism in the United Kingdom
- Buddhism in Europe
