= Kingsbury Buddhist temple =

Temple in England

Kingsbury Buddhist temple - Sri Saddhatissa International Buddhist Centre
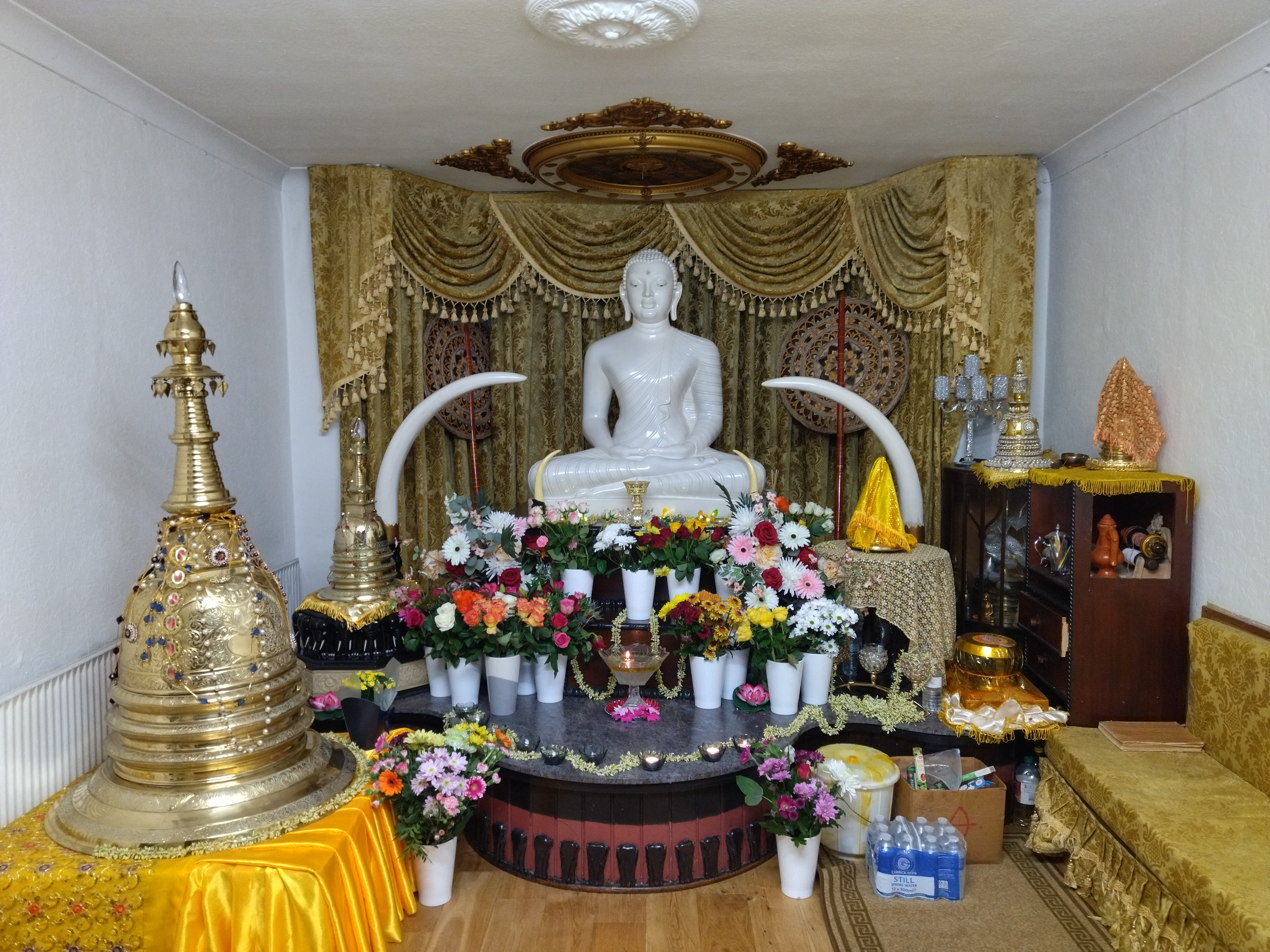
- Kingsbury Buddhist temple, interior view

Religion
- Affiliation: Theravada Buddhism

Location
- Location: Kingsbury, London, United Kingdom
- Country: United Kingdom
- Interactive map of Kingsbury Buddhist temple - Sri Saddhatissa International Buddhist Centre
- Coordinates: 51°35′04″N 0°16′02″W

Website
- ssibc.org

The Kingsbury Buddhist temple (full name Kingsbury Buddhist temple - Sri Saddhatissa International Buddhist Centre) is a Theravada Buddhist vihara (monastery) and temple in Kingsbury, London, United Kingdom.

The temple was founded in 1984 by Sri Lankan immigrants and bikkhus (monks). After moving twice, it moved to its current location in 1991.
