= Norwich Buddhist Centre =

Buddhist centre in Norwich, Norfolk, England

Coordinates: 52.6297°N 1.2985°E

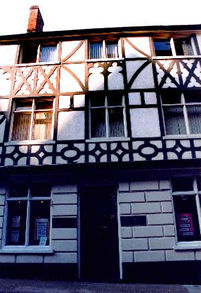
Norwich Buddhist Centre exterior.

The Norwich Buddhist Centre (UK) was established in Norwich, Norfolk, England in 1976. The centre is run by people associated with a Buddhist organisation called the Triratna Buddhist Community, previously the Friends of the Western Buddhist Order, founded by Sangharakshita in 1968.

== Main activities ==
The Norwich Buddhist Centre is involved in teaching Buddhist Meditation techniques to the general public. The centre also teaches Yoga and other methods of personal development. It draws on the resources of the Clear Vision Trust for educational audio-visual materials as well as Windhorse Publications for its printed books, both of which are registered charities. The Centre encourages those who attend meditation classes to also go on Buddhist retreats; two retreat centres affiliated with the Norwich Buddhist Centre are Padmaloka Buddhist Retreat Centre for men and Taraloka Retreat Centre for women.

Norwich Buddhist Centre offers teaching in yoga, styles taught at the Centre include Iyengar yoga, Hatha Yoga and Scaravelli inspired yoga.
