= Dhamma Talaka Pagoda =

Burmese Buddhist pagoda in United Kingdom

Coordinates: 52°28′45″N 1°55′58″W

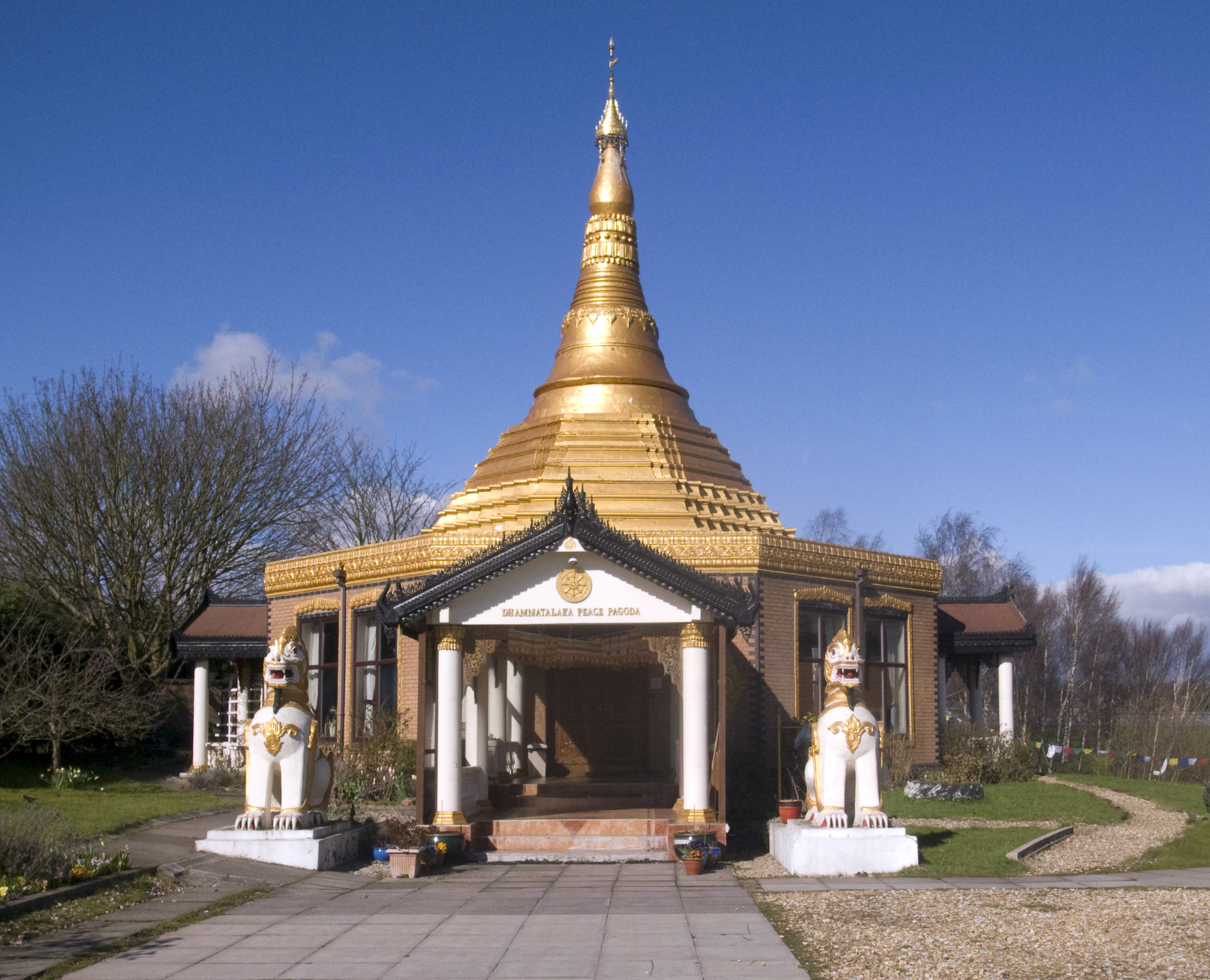
Dhamma Talaka Peace Pagoda, Ladywood, Birmingham

Dhamma Talaka Peace Pagoda was opened in Birmingham, UK in 1998 and is the only such building in traditional Burmese style in the Western hemisphere. On its grounds there are now a monastery and the teaching hall of a planned Buddhist Academy.

== Creating a pilgrimage site ==
Dhamma Talaka Pagoda was planned by the renowned scholar and meditation teacher, Aggamahapandita Rewata Dhamma to enshrine the Buddha relics of the former Burmese royal family. Shared with visiting monks by the exiled former king Thibaw Min of Burma, the relics had been passed into Dr Rewata Dhamma's keeping in 1964. The pagoda's name means ‘Reservoir of the Teaching’ and refers to its situation behind the Edgbaston Reservoir, a leet from which forms the boundary on one side of the property. The site was dedicated in 1990 and the pagoda was officially opened at an international ceremony in 1998. In 2002 the Sangharama Monastery was built in the same grounds and the Rewata Dhamma teaching hall in 2007. There is also a meditation garden to one side, overlooking the slope of the dam.

The base and walls of the pagoda are octagonal. The interior focuses upon a gold-painted shrine on which there is a large marble statue of the Buddha in meditation posture, sculpted in Burmese style in Mandalay. Images of the Twenty Eight Buddhas were created on site by a Burmese workman and mounted round the inner dome. The entrance is reached by a gabled arcade. Teak doors on three sides of the building are carved with temple guardians and two traditional lion statues at the arcade's entrance provide protection from evil elements. The inner dome supports a gold-painted stepped spire in the same style as the Shwedagon Pagoda in Yangon, rising to an ornate umbrella feature above which is mounted a crystal bud. The main relics are housed immediately above the dome and also include a chunk of the Berlin Wall, collected when it was dismantled in 1989. The Pagoda was also dedicated to the Gyalwa Karmapa, head of the Karma Kagyu school of Tibetan Buddhism.

The pagoda complex is administered by the Birmingham Buddhist Vihara Trust, which was originally set up in 1982 when Dr Rewata Dhamma converted a house in a street nearby into a monastery and meditation centre.
