= Hammalawa Saddhatissa =

Sri Lankan philosopher (1914–1990)

Hammalawa Saddhatissa Thero
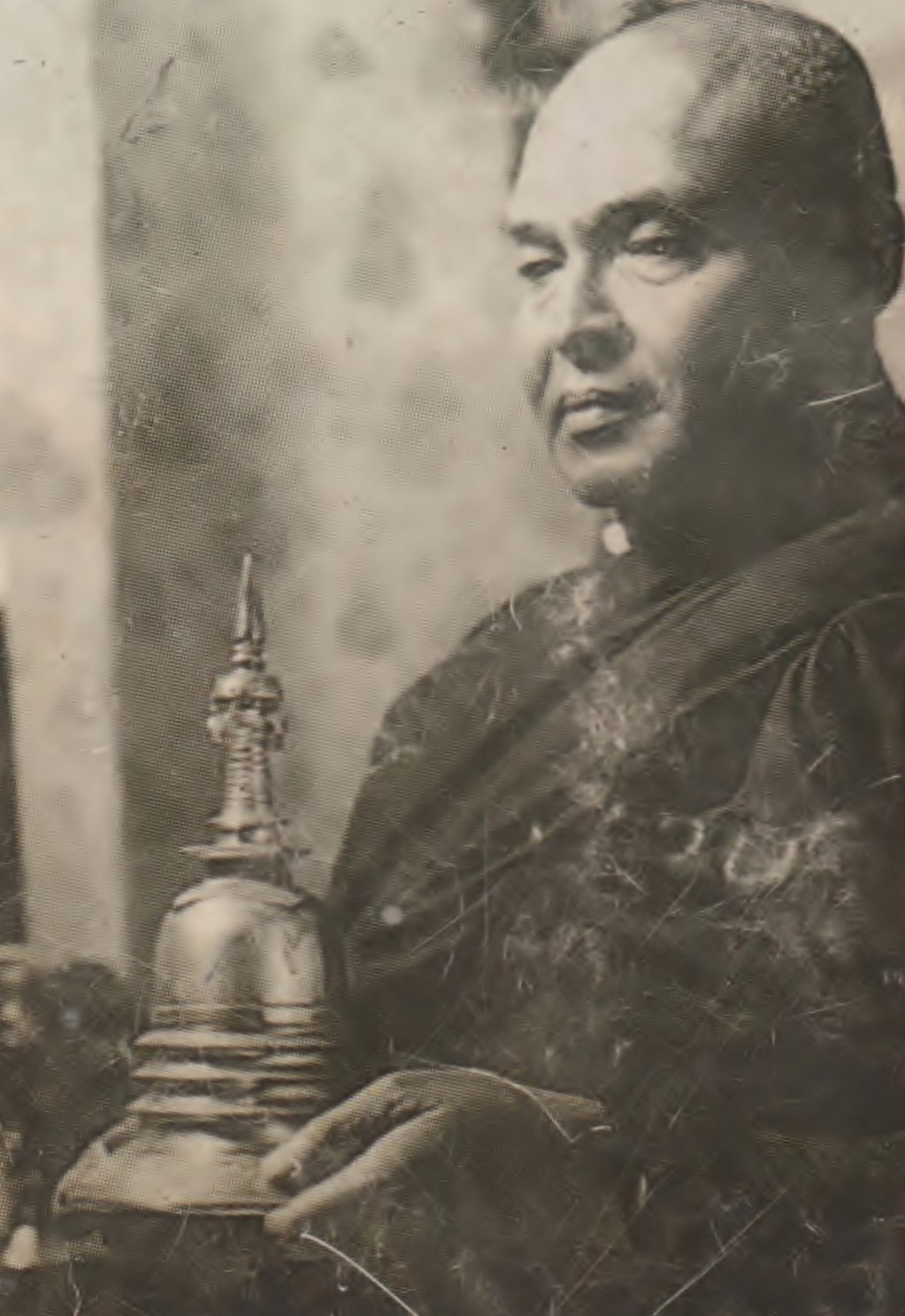

Personal life
- Born: 1914 Hammalawa, Sri Lanka
- Died: 1990 (aged 75–76)

Religious life
- Religion: Buddhism
- School: Theravada

Hammalawa Saddhatissa Maha Thera (1914–1990) was an ordained Buddhist monk, missionary and author from Sri Lanka, educated in Varanasi, London, and Edinburgh. He was a contemporary of Walpola Rahula, also of Sri Lanka.

== Early life ==
Saddhatissa was born in 1914 Hammalawa, a hamlet in the northwest of Sri Lanka. He ordained as a sāmaṇera (novice monk) at the age of twelve in 1926. He received his early education at the Sastrodaya Pirivena at Sandalankawa and continued his higher studies at Vidyodaya Pirivena, Colombo, where he passed the final examinations with honours.

== Missionary work in India ==
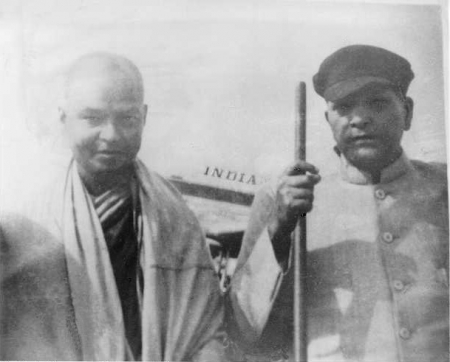
Dr. Babasaheb Ambedkar with Bhante H. Saddatissa at Varanasi Airport, Babatpur on 30 Nov. 1956

The Maha Bodhi Society invited Saddhatissa to become a missionary (dharmaduta) monk in India like his contemporary Henepola Gunaratana. In order to teach to Indians he learnt Indian languages such as Hindi, Urdu and Punjabi. While in India, he came to know B. R. Ambedkar, who reportedly obtained advice from him on how to draft the Indian constitution along the lines of the vinaya. He also obtained an M.A. Degree from the Banaras Hindu University and then became a lecturer there.

== Stay in the West ==
In 1957 he traveled to London at the request of the Maha Bodhi Society and lived the rest of his life in the West.

He obtained his PhD from the University of Edinburgh and held academic appointments at a number of universities. He was a visiting lecturer in Buddhist studies at Oxford University; a lecturer in Sinhala at the University of London; and Professor of Pali and Buddhism at the University of Toronto. He was a Buddhist Chaplain at the London University and a vice president of the Pali Text Society.

At the time of his death he was the head of the London Buddhist Vihara and the Head of the Sangha (Sanghanayaka) of the United Kingdom and Europe of the Siam Nikaya of Sri Lanka."

He was posthumously honored in 2005 by Sri Lanka with a postage stamp bearing his image.

== Philosophy ==
Due to spending years at SOAS, University of London, Saddhatissa developed a sensitivity to Western philosophical discourse. He thus developed his thought, specifically in Buddhist ethics, with both traditional training and Western thought in mind. His primary Western influence (in Buddhist Ethics at least) appears to be Fyodor Shcherbatskoy, followed by the Belgian philologist Louis de La Vallée-Poussin.

His main interest was in staying close to the 'lived expression' of Buddhism as opposed to abstract academic theorising.

Unlike other expositors of Buddhism -- for example, some representatives of the Ch'an and Zen traditions, who sometimes regard moral practice as a kind of preliminary to the meditational practice of mindfulness, and who take enlightenment to be a kind of epistemological transformation, a new and holistic way of seeing reality -- Saddhatissa regards moral practice and the practice of mindfulness as a seamless whole."

== Published works ==
=== Books ===
- The Buddha's Way (1971) ISBN 0-8076-0634-0 (Paperbound) ISBN 0-8076-0635-9 (Hardbound)
- Before He Was Buddha: The Life of Siddhartha with Jack Kornfield (2000) ISBN 1-56975-230-3
- Buddhist Ethics (1970) (1987) and (1997 & 2003) ISBN 0-86171-124-6
- The Sutta Nipata trans. (1985) ISBN 0-7007-0181-8 (Wisdom Books)
- A Buddhist's Manual (1976) ASIN: B000YH9HP8
- Facets of Buddhism (2016), Buddhist Publication Society, ISBN 978-955-24-0425-2

=== Articles ===
- Dependent Origination (.pdf) (1989)

=== Reviews ===
- Buddhist Ethics, reviewed by Bhikkhu Bodhi, Buddhist Publication Society Newsletter, No. 11, Winter 1989, 3–4
- Buddhist Ethics, reviewed by Koller, John M. Philosophy East and West Vol. 50, No. 2 (April 2000) pp. 294–297
