= Three Wheels Temple =

Shin Buddhist temple in London, England

Three Wheels
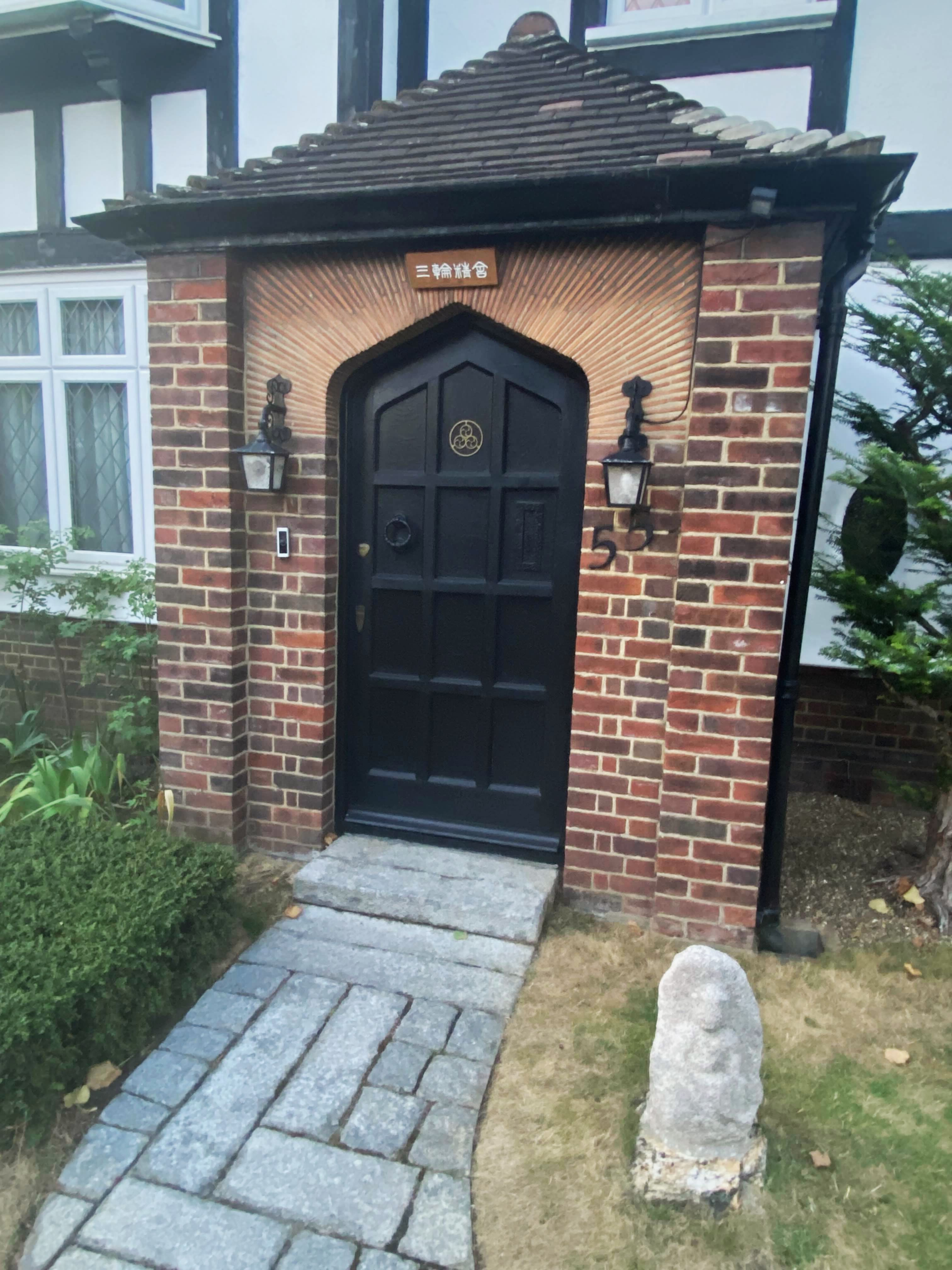
- Front door with logo & Buddha carved into stone at Three Wheels Temple

Religion
- Affiliation: Jōdo Shinshū
- Sect: Higashi Hongan-ji
- Year consecrated: 1994
- Status: Active

Location
- Location: Acton, London
- Country: England
- Interactive map of Three Wheels
- Coordinates: 51.503704°N 0.285351°W

Website
- https://threewheels.org.uk/

Three Wheels is a Shin Buddhist temple in London, England, founded in 1994. It is the London branch of Shogyōji (正行寺), a temple in Fukuoka Prefecture, Japan, which has affiliations with the larger Higashi Hongan-ji (Ōtani-ha) branch of Shin Buddhism.

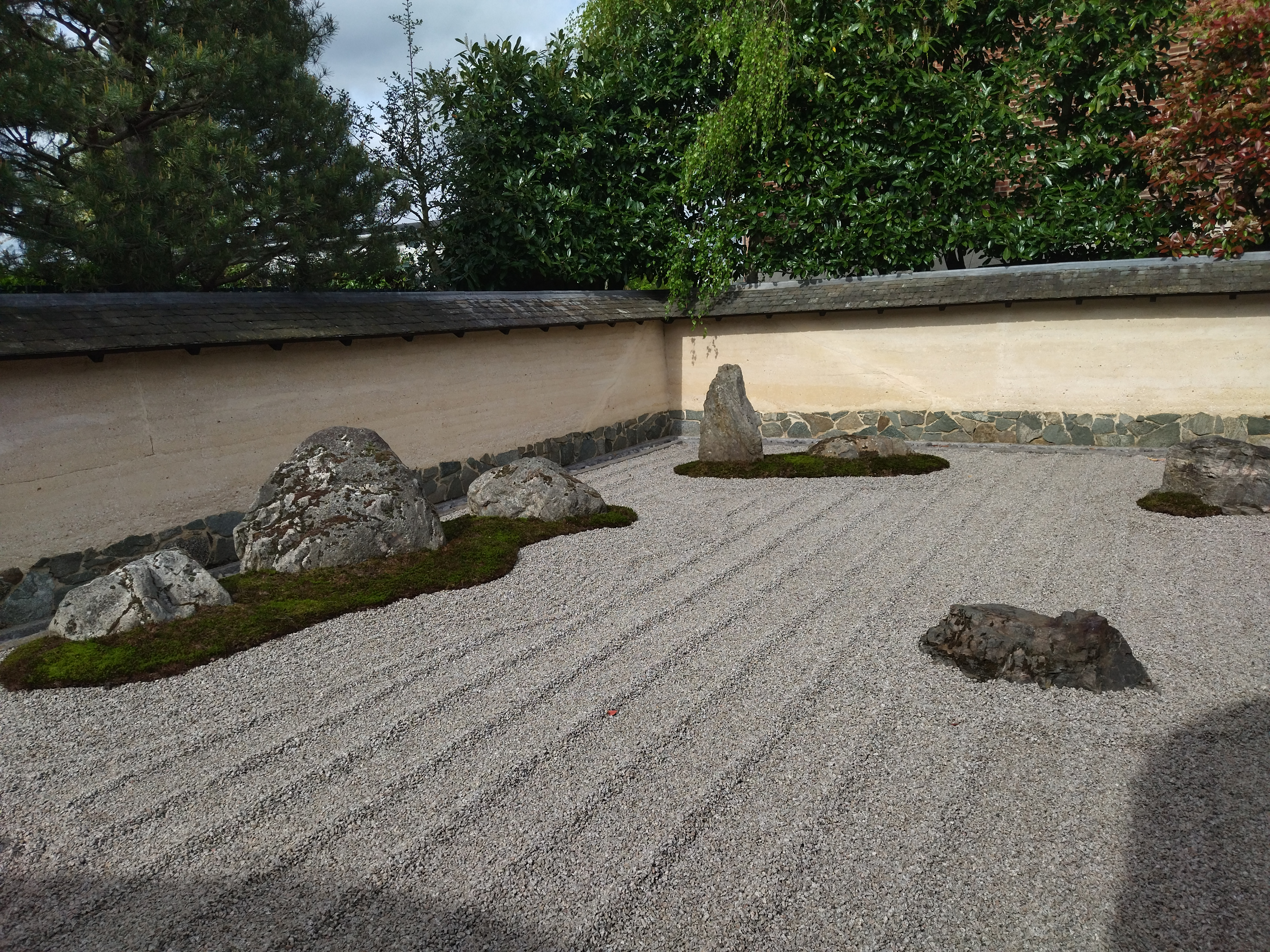
Zen garden at Three Wheels Temple, London, UK

The temple was founded by Kemmyō Taira Sato, a former pupil of D. T. Suzuki, supporting both the local Japanese diaspora and non-Japanese attendees. The temple is spread across three buildings, with a main building holding the primary altar and two separate buildings used for events and hosting guests, alongside a Zen garden. The Zen garden was designed by John White, art historian and professor at University College London, and it opened in 1997.

Three Wheels conducts daily services, meditation sessions, twice-yearly shokai retreats (a term coined from two characters meaning "to flow" and "to open") involving communal meals, dharma talks, and chanting, and services such as funerals and weddings. The temple also hosts bi-monthly eza gatherings, which feature dharma talks in English. The term "eza" means "to meet and sit" and is a distinctive practice within the Shogyōji lineage of temples, compared with the wider Shin Buddhist movement.

Since 1997, Three Wheels has conducted a yearly Annual Ceremony to Pray for World Peace and Reconciliation between British and Japanese War Veterans.
