= Throssel Hole Buddhist Abbey =

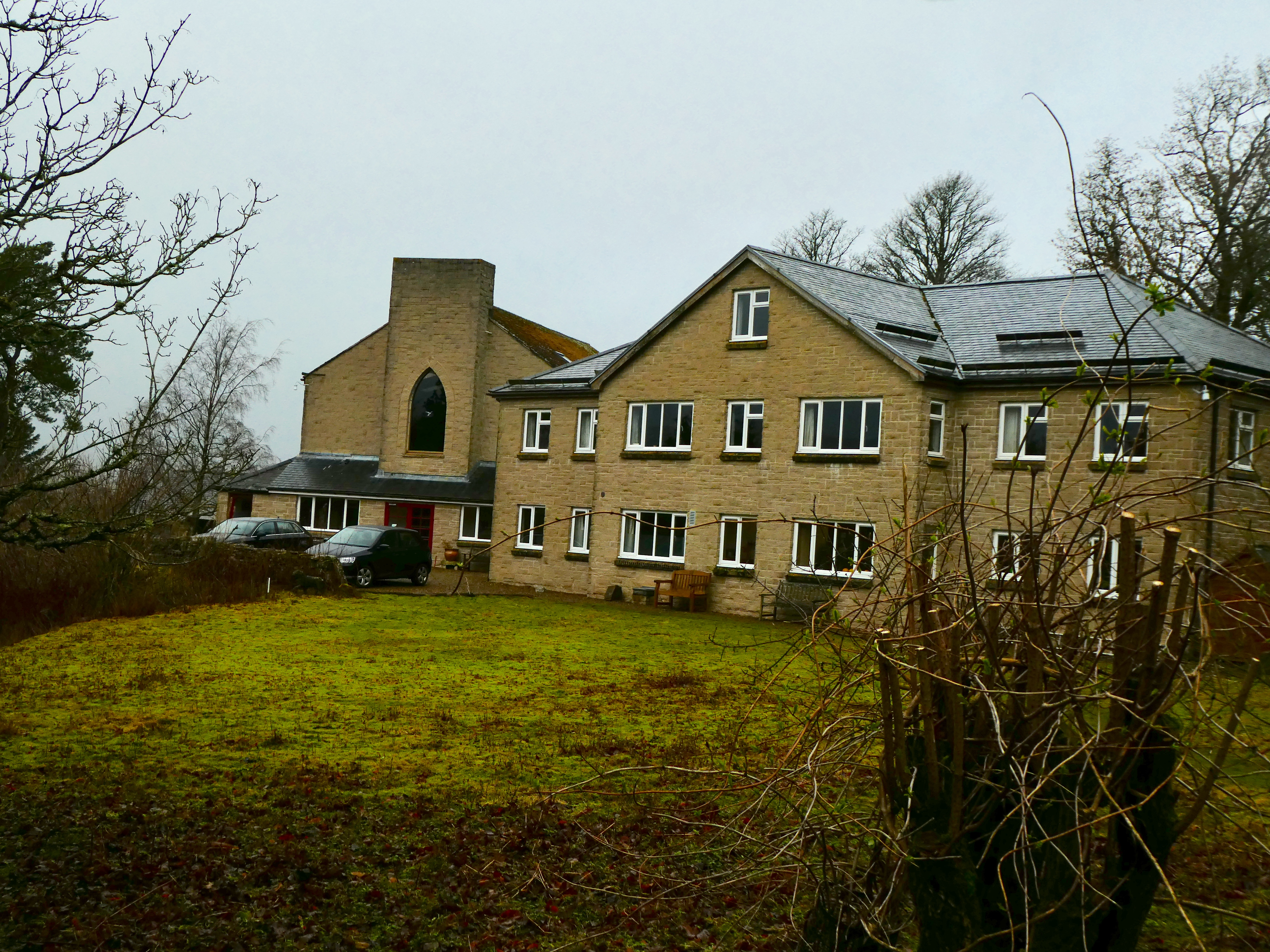
- External view of the abbey in 2019.

- Location within Northumberland
- Interactive map of Throssel Hole Buddhist Abbey

Monastery information
- Full name: Throssel Hole Buddhist Abbey
- Other name: Throssel Hole Abbey
- Order: Order of Buddhist Contemplatives
- Established: 1972

People
- Founder: Rev. Master Houn Jiyu-Kennett

Site
- Location: Northumberland, England
- Coordinates: 54.84253°N 2.31736°W
- Grid reference: NY7971749792
- Public access: yes, with appointment
- Website: throssel.org.uk%20throssel.org.uk

Throssel Hole Buddhist Abbey is a Buddhist monastery and retreat centre located in Northumberland, in northern England. The monastic order is equally for men and women. It follows the Serene Reflection Meditation Tradition, similar to the Sōtō Zen sect in Japan. It is part of the Order of Buddhist Contemplatives. Throssel Hole was established in 1972. It offers retreats, festivals and other events for anyone who wishes to learn about or deepen their practice of meditation.

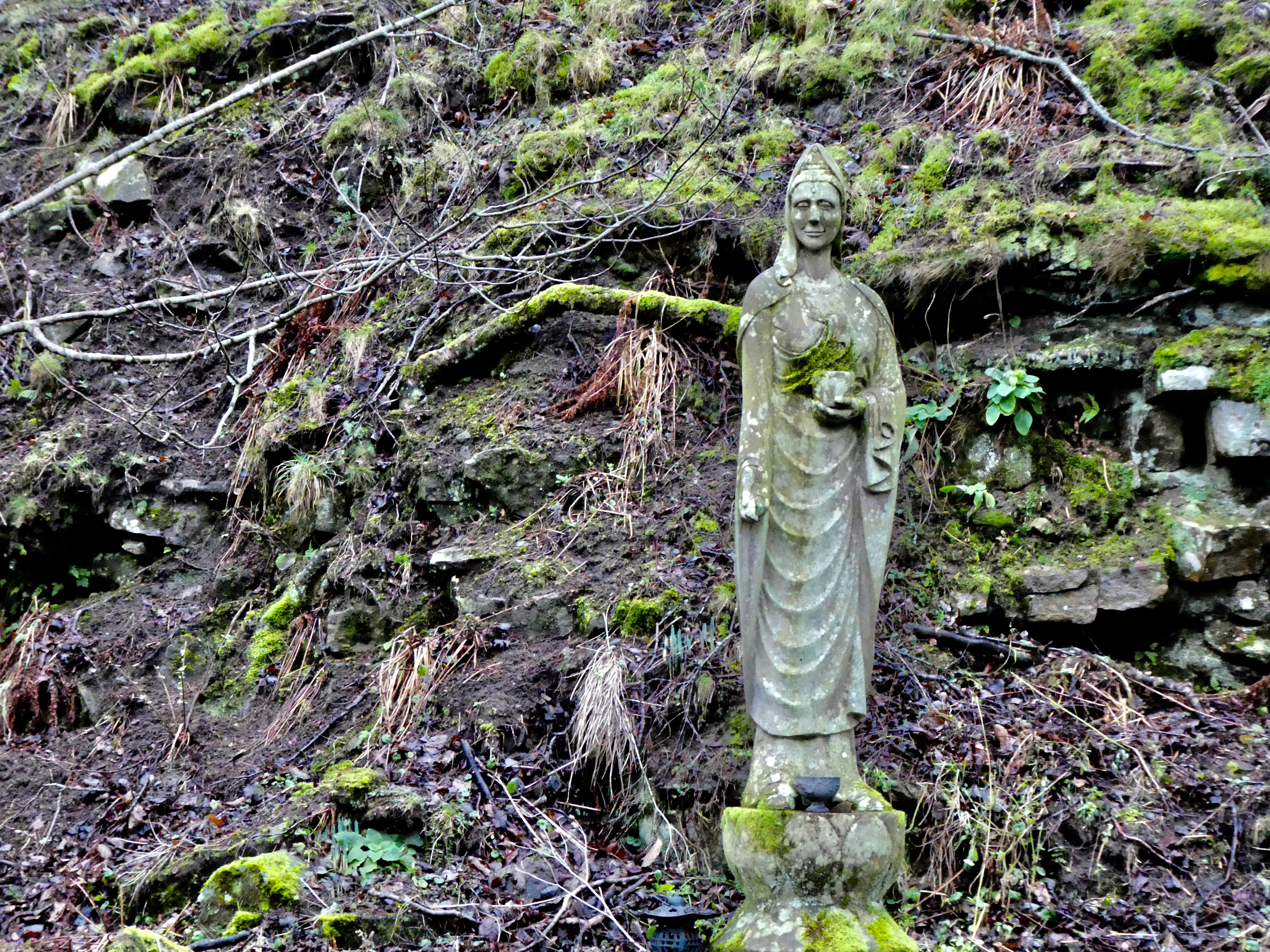
Kanzeon, Throssel Hole Abbey
