= Aryaloka Buddhist Center =

Buddhist organization in New England

The Aryaloka Buddhist Center is a Buddhist organization in Newmarket, New Hampshire, affiliated with the Triratna Buddhist Community. It currently holds various activities for the Buddhist community, including yoga and meditation retreats.

== History ==
The center was founded in 1985 as an establishment that would provide ideal conditions for practicing Buddhism. It is currently situated on thirteen acres of secluded land.

The center distributes the irregularly published magazine Vajra Bell.

== Features ==
=== Facilities ===
The center consists of two buildings: the main building, and a smaller building known as the "akashaloka", which serve as accommodations for guests and retreat participants. Some of amenities are included below:

Main building

- Large, multi-purpose room
- Large meditation hall
- Large lounge/dining area
- Kitchen
- Bedrooms
- Buddhist reference library
- Buddhaworks bookstore

Akashaloka

- Small meditation hall
- Small lounge/dining area
- Kitchen
- Bedrooms
- Fourteen acres of woodland with walking trails

=== Stupa ===
In March 2009, three order members, Bodhilocana, Viriyagita, and Kiranada, led a ceremony in remembrance of one of Sangharakshita's teachers, Dhardo Rimpoche. Bodhilocana incited the community to build a stupa to hold Rimpoche's remains.

In the summer of 2014, the Dhardo Rimpoche Stupa was established on the center grounds. It is one among several stupas throughout the world among which Rinpoche's remains have been spread, the others being Sudarshanaloka Retreat Centre near Thames, New Zealand, Padmaloka Buddhist Retreat Centre near Norwich, England, Guhyaloka Retreat Centre near Alicante, Spain, Tiratanaloka Retreat Centre in Wales, and Vimaladhatu Retreat Centre in the Sauerland, Germany.

== See also ==
- Triratna Buddhist Community
- Dharma center
