= Nalanda (disambiguation) =

Nalanda was an acclaimed Mahavihara, a large Buddhist monastery in ancient Magadha (modern-day Bihar), India.

Nalanda may also refer to:

- Nalanda district, an administrative district of Bihar, India
- Nalanda (Lok Sabha constituency), a Lok Sabha constituency
- Nalanda Gedige, an ancient temple in Sri Lanka
- Nalanda, a village in Matale District, Sri Lanka
- Nalanda (genus), a beetle genus

== Education ==
- Nalanda Boys' Central College, a boys' school in Minuwangoda, Sri Lanka
- Nalanda College, Biharsharif, a college in Bihar Sharif, Bihar, India
- Nalanda College, Colombo, a school in Colombo, Sri Lanka
- Nalanda Girls' College, a girls' school in Minuwangoda, Sri Lanka
- Nalanda Open University, a university at Patna, Bihar, India
- Nalanda University, a.k.a. Nalanda International University, a university (opened 2014) near the ruins of Nalanda, Bihar, India
- The Karma Shri Nalanda Institute for Higher Buddhist Studies at Rumtek monastery, an affiliate of Sampurnanand Sanskrit University in Varanasi, India
- Nalanda Monastery (France), a Tibetan Buddhist center affiliated with the FPMT

== See also ==
- All pages beginning with Nalanda
