= Nalanda University (disambiguation) =

Nalanda University or Nālandā University, established in 2010, is a university in the ancient city of Rajgir in the state of Bihar, India.

It may also refer to:

- Nava Nalanda Mahavihara, university established in 1951
- Nalanda mahavihara, ancient institution
- Nalanda Open University, university established in 1987

== See also ==
- Nalanda (disambiguation)
