= Dharmachari Subhuti =

British Buddhist leader

Subhuti
- Born: Alex Kennedy; 1947; United Kingdom
- Occupation(s): Buddhist teacher, author

Dharmachari Subhuti, born Alex Kennedy, is a senior associate at the Triratna Buddhist Community (formerly the Friends of the Western Buddhist Order), founded by Sangharakshita, and president of the London Buddhist Centre. He has held various positions of leadership and been instrumental in many developments in the community.

Subhuti was influential in the building of the London Buddhist Centre, which opened in 1978, and he helped raise funds from the Greater London Council for its completion. He developed training for men preparing to be ordained into the Triratna Buddhist Order at the Padmaloka retreat centre, near Norwich, in England. He also helped found Guhyaloka, a retreat centre in Spain, where men make final preparations to become members of the order.

As well as being involved in the spread of the Dharma in the West, particularly in Britain, Subhuti spends six months each year working with the community's Indian wing, the Triratna Bauddha Mahāsaṅgha (TBM).

Most of TBM's members are drawn from the poorest people in India, sometimes referred to as Dalits, or so-called "untouchables". The late Dalit leader B. R. Ambedkar converted to Buddhism, saying it was necessary to escape the caste oppression and discrimination that this group experienced. Hundreds of thousands of Ambedkar's followers subsequently converted to Buddhism.

Following the turn of the millennium, Subhuti raised concerns over the circumstances of some of Sangharakshita's past sexual relationships, and around the same time, his chairmanship of Triratna's Preceptors College was handed on to Dharmachari Dhammarati. In the years leading up to Sangarakshita's death in 2018, Subhuti and Sangharakshita collaborated closely to produce a series of new articles clarifying and reemphasizing Triratna's core approach and principles.

== Published works ==
Subhuti's books include Sangharakshita: A New Voice in the Buddhist Tradition, which explores what Sangharakshita has contributed to the practice of Buddhism and the spread of Buddhism in the West. He has also published The Buddhist Vision (an introductory book on Buddhism), Bringing Buddhism to the West (a short biography of Sangharakshita), Buddhism for Today, Women, men, and angels, and Buddhism and Friendship.

Subhuti argues that "sexual interest on the part of a male order member for a male mitra (younger, inexperienced student of Buddhism) can create a connection which may allow kalyana mitrata (spiritual friendship) to develop". He goes on to claim that while "some, of course, are predisposed to this attraction, others have deliberately chosen to change their sexual preferences in order to use sex as a medium of kalyana mitrata" (spiritual friendship). He also suggests that "male-female relationships … are probably not particularly spiritually productive", and he speaks "of the dangers of male-female relationships". Those who cannot follow such ideas, he suggests, are blocked by "taboo" or a "reluctance to give up a conditioned predisposition",
