= Surlingham =

Village in Norfolk, England

Coordinates: 52.6068°N 1.4154°E

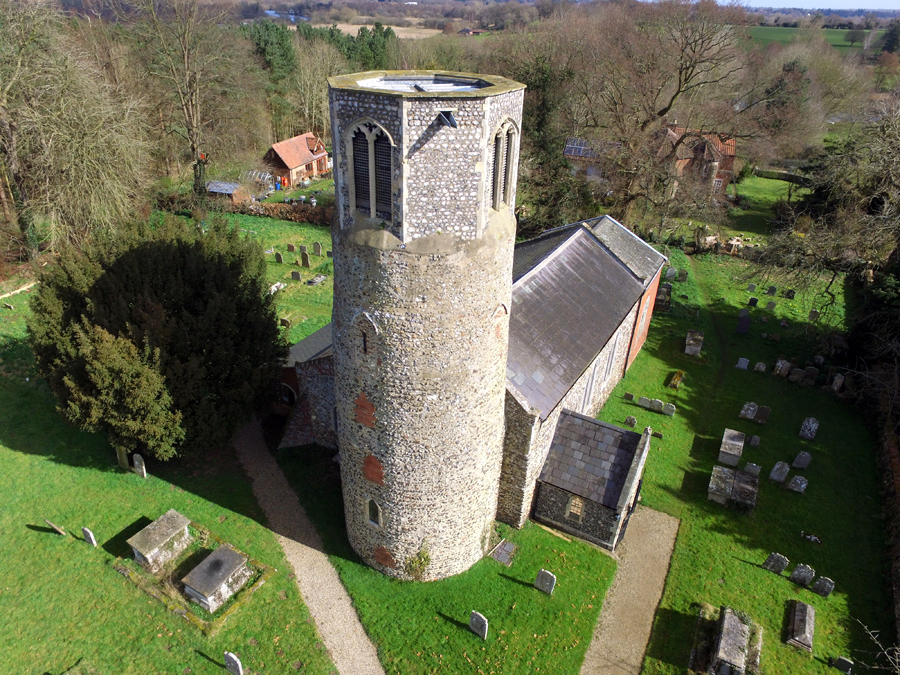
- Surlingham St Mary

- Location within Norfolk
- Area: 7.32 km^{2} (2.83 sq mi)
- Population: 725 (2011)
  - Density: 99/km^{2} (260/sq mi)
- OS grid reference: TG314065
- Civil parish: Surlingham
- District: South Norfolk
- Shire county: Norfolk
- Region: East
- Country: England
- Sovereign state: United Kingdom
- Post town: NORWICH
- Postcode district: NR14
- Dialling code: 01508
- Police: Norfolk
- Fire: Norfolk
- Ambulance: East of England
- UK Parliament: South Norfolk

Surlingham is a village and civil parish in the South Norfolk district of Norfolk situated on the Broads in eastern United Kingdom. It lies approximately 6½ miles (10½ km) south-east of Norwich on the south bank of the River Yare between Bramerton and Rockland St Mary. In the 2001 census it contained 266 households and a population of 637, increasing to 725 at the 2011 census. Although Surlingham is part of South Norfolk District, as in other broadland villages those areas of the village adjacent to the river and broads fall into the executive area of the Broads Authority.

== Toponymy ==
The village's name origin is uncertain. 'Homestead/village of the south Herlingas (= *Herela's people)' or possibly, 'of the Sutherlingas'. In both cases, the point of reference is probably the River Yare.

== Churches ==
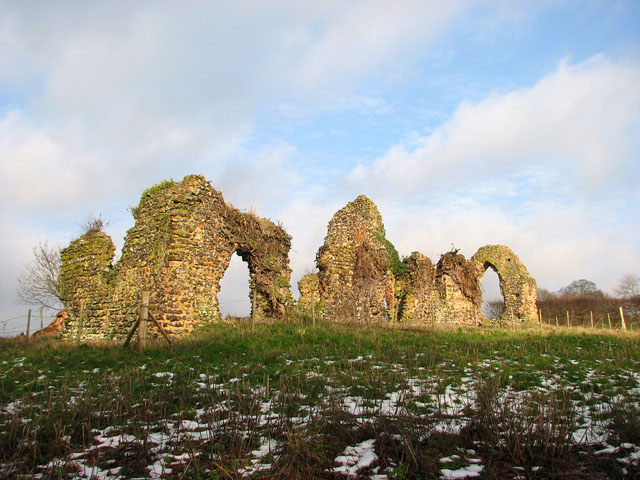
The ruins of St Saviour's Church in Surlingham

The church of St Mary in Surlingham is one of 124 existing round-tower churches in Norfolk.

The adjacent Church Marsh nature reserve is leased by the RSPB and is overlooked by the ruins of St Saviour's Church, less than half a mile north-east of St Mary's. Dating from the 12th century, St Saviour's was in regular use until 1705. Its dedication was only held by two churches in Norfolk; this and the one in Norwich. A campaign has been launched by local villagers to save the site from further deterioration and to make it safe for visitors. Norfolk naturalist Ted Ellis is buried here.

== Village ==
Surlingham Community Primary School currently caters for around 80 children in four classrooms, two in the original Victorian building and two more built in a similar style completed in 2006. It is situated on Walnut Hill in the centre of Surlingham opposite the village pond. Also in the centre of the village are a village shop, post office and a garage. In 2011 a choir, "Surlingham Broadnotes", was started in the village.

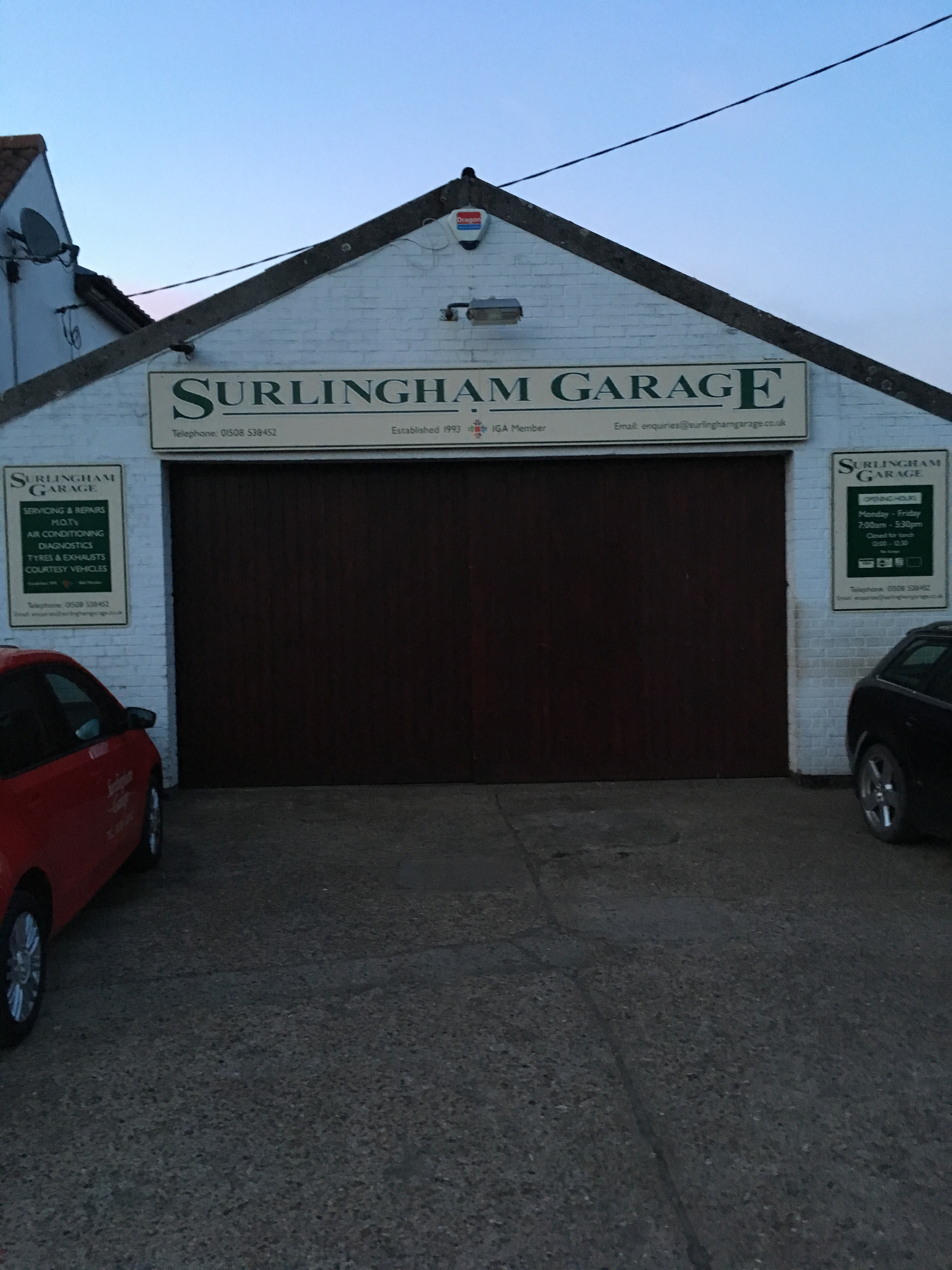
Surlingham Garage "Established 1993"

== Pubs ==
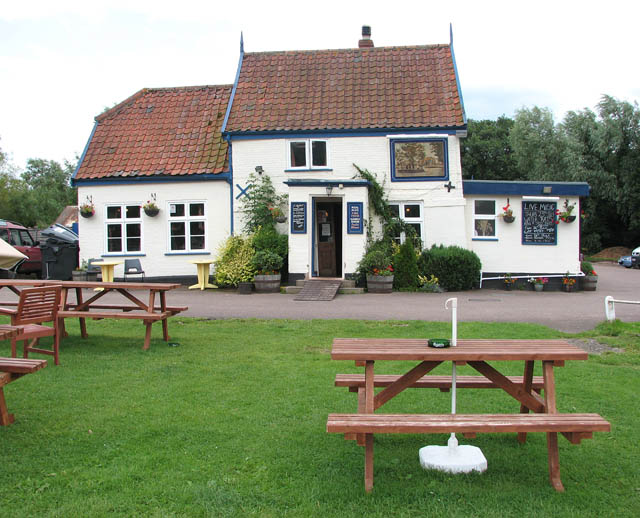
The Ferry House Inn, Surlingham

The village has two pubs, both in the north of the village on the bank of the river, the Coldham Hall Tavern and The Ferry House Inn. The latter marks the site of a ferry across the Yare to Postwick which stopped operating around 1939 following a collision with a coaster.

== Surlingham Broad ==
Lying between Surlingham Ferry and Coldham Hall Tavern is Surlingham Broad, a maze of waterways and swamp over 1 km^{2} in area leased by Norfolk Wildlife Trust. One of the central lakes, Bargate, is connected to the Yare by two dykes; the area is known as the 'wherry graveyard' as 13 wherry hulls have been sunk here. It was in the Yare valley and in particular on Surlingham Broad in the 1950s that Dr Joyce Lambert, helped by schoolboys from the City of Norwich School, began taking peat borings which led her to conclude that the Broads were the result of human activity, peat digging.

== Wheatfen Broad ==
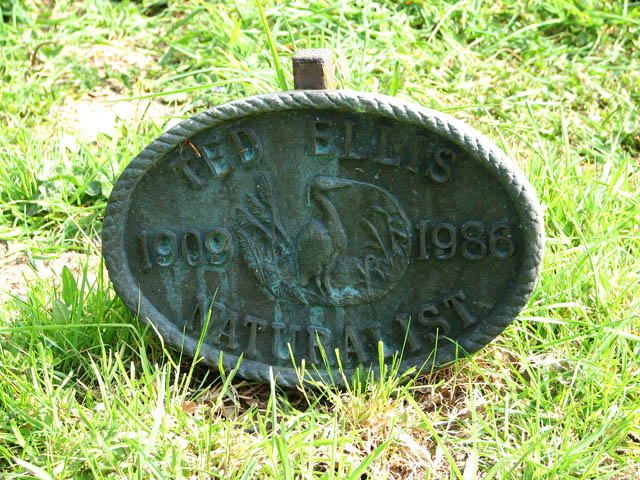
Gravestone marking the burial place of naturalist Ted Ellis

A well known and widely respected local figure, the writer, broadcaster and naturalist Ted Ellis (1909–1986) lived near Surlingham with his wife Phyllis for 40 years at Wheatfen Cottage near Wheatfen Broad. Ellis, who was known in print as E.A. Ellis, set up and developed his own nature reserve at the broad which is today known as Wheatfen Nature Reserve and is managed by the Ted Ellis Trust. A study centre was opened at the nature reserve in 2011.

From 1928 to 1956 Ellis was Keeper of Natural History at Norwich Castle Museum, but aged 47 he resigned to focus on his work as a naturalist. He wrote a nature column in the local newspaper, the Eastern Daily Press, above the byline 'E.A.E'. (for Edward Augustine Ellis). As E. A. Ellis, he wrote books including the volume on The Broads in Collins' New Naturalists series. He often appeared on local television (on BBC Look East and 'Weekend') and on radio (on BBC Radio 4's Nature Postbag) and he was active in many nature and conservation organisations.

A naturalist with a national reputation whose painstaking research was respected and admired by the academic world, he communicated his enthusiasm to a wide audience through his writing and broadcasting. Ellis and his wife are buried among the ruins of St Saviour's Church.

David Bellamy compared the significance of Wheatfen Broad to that of "Mount Everest or the giant redwood forests of North America". He went on, "It is probably the best bit of fenland we have because we know so much about it... purely because one man gave his life trying to understand it – Ted Ellis."

== Padmaloka ==
Padmaloka Buddhist Retreat Centre, one of the biggest Buddhist retreat centres in the UK, is located at Lesingham House in the village. The centre is run by the Triratna Buddhist Community (formerly the Friends of the Western Buddhist Order). 'Padmaloka' means 'realm of the lotus'.

== Sports and Recreation ==
- Coldham Hall Sailing Club which was founded in 1951 is situated in the grounds of Coldham Hall Tavern.
- In 2009 a football team ("Surlingham Tornadoes") was established to give boys and girls in the village the opportunity to play the game.
- In 2012 a small group of residents from Surlingham and surrounding villages formed an informal cycling club called the Ghostriders. So named because of their tendency to cycle in the evenings, enjoy liquid refreshment in local pubs and cycle home late at night. In 2015, five Ghostriders cycled from Lands End to John O'Groats via the Isle of Arran, a distance of 1030 miles over 14 days.

== Transport links ==
Surlingham is linked to Norwich by bus route 65 operated by Konectbus, providing nine services a day into Norwich via Rockland St Mary, Bramerton and Kirby Bedon.

National Cycle Route 1 passes through Surlingham on its way from Norwich to Beccles via Loddon.

== Notable residents ==
- Ted Ellis, naturalist, died 1986.
- Sangharakshita (1925–2018), founder of the Friends of the Western Buddhist Order, and author of a large number of books on Buddhism, lived in the village for many years.
