= Jagdish Kashyap =

Jagdish Kashyap (born Jagdish Narain) was a Buddhist monk. He was born on 2 May 1908 in Ranchi, Bengal Presidency, India. The name Kashyap was given to him at his bhikkhu ordination in 1933. He played a major role in the establishment of the Nava Nalanda Mahavihara.

== Biography ==
Jagdish Kashyap was born in Ranchi, Bengal Presidency (now in Jharkhand) in 1908. His birth name was Jagdish Narain. His early education was in Ranchi and he later pursued his higher education at Patna College. In 1931, he graduated with what would be his first MA from Banaras Hindu University.

Jagdish was highly influenced by the then popular Arya Samaj movement and took up the role as the leader of a gurukul situated near Baidyanath Temple. It was during this time that he began engaging with Buddhist literature. While the Arya Samaj questioned the caste system, it did not provide all the answers that Jagdish was seeking. Instead, he turned to the vision of a casteless society that was espoused by the Buddha. Jagdish Kashyap befriended another former Arya Samaj member who had turned to Buddhism, Rahul Sankrityayan who acted as a mentor to Jagdish and advised him to travel to Sri Lanka which he did in 1933. In Sri Lanka, Jagdish became an ordained monk and was given the title of tipitik acharya. He was ordained by Venerable L. Dhammananda Nayaka Mahathero. During his time at the Vidyalankara Pirivena he translated the Digha Nikāya into Hindi.

While travelling to Japan later that year, he was stopped by the police in Malaysia due to his involvement in Gandhi's non-cooperation movement. Due to restrictions that he was under, he spent a year living in Penang, learned some Chinese, lived in a Chinese vihara, and published a collection of lectures.

In 1936 he returned to Sri Lanka to spend time in a forest hermitage to practice meditation, which was quite unusual for a bhikkhu in his day, so much so that his teachers tried to dissuade him. Kashyap continued to practice meditation throughout his life. Towards the end of 1936, he returned to India and in 1937 settled at Sarnath where he was involved in scholarly and translating work, principally of the Pāli Canon into Hindi. In Sarnath, he became associated with the Mahabodhi Society and was soon helping with the institutional organisation and social services. He became the headmaster of a new high school founded by the Mahabodhi Society General Secretary, Devapriya Valisinha. While in Sarnath he also worked for Benares Hindu University to offer courses in Pāli - even occasionally walking the 22-mile journey into Varanasi. Some accounts say this was because he persuaded officials to start these courses and even taught them for free, the accounts below vary slightly. During this time Kashyap took on a young English monk as a live-in student for about nine months. Sangharakshita went on to found the Western Buddhist Order in 1968, and considers Kashyap to have been an important teacher in both the spiritual and secular senses.

Sangharakshita's version of the Benares University job, as he understood from Kashyap:

As he had already confided to me, he was there very much on sufferance. Dominated as it was by orthodox brahmins, the University had not wanted to have a Professor of Pali and Buddhist Philosophy at all, and Kashyap-ji’s appointment had been due to the insistence of the multimillionaire philanthropist Jugal Kishore Birla, a benefactor whose wishes the University could not afford to ignore. But though the University had been forced to appoint a Professor of Pali and Buddhist Philosophy it was not obliged to supply him with pupils. In fact it made it as difficult as possible for him to get any. Under University regulations, no one could take Pali without also taking Sanskrit. In other words Pali and Buddhist Philosophy were not allowed to become alternatives to Sanskrit and Hindu Philosophy. One could take Sanskrit and Pali, or only Sanskrit, but under no circumstances could one take only Pali. So effectively did these tactics limit the number of Kashyap-ji’s students that he never had more than three or four, sometimes none at all. For someone as devoted to his subject as he was this was a bitter disappointment. He had accepted the professorship only because he hoped it would enable him to make some contribution to the advancement of Buddhist studies and thus, indirectly, to the cause of Buddhism; but as it became more obvious every year that Pali and Buddhist Philosophy were unwelcome guests at the Benares Hindu University, he had come to the conclusion that he was wasting his time there and he was now thinking of resigning.

In 1947 India became independent and there was a new sense of identity for Indians. In 1949 he toured his ancestral homeland, the ancient province of Magadha, which was also the centre of ancient Buddhism. For the first time in many centuries, the villages in Magadha saw a yellow-robed bhikkhu and were pleasantly surprised to find that he spoke their local dialect Magadhi. The locals had long forgotten their own history and Kashyap was able to furnish many details. The very name of the state of Bihar comes from the presence of so many Buddhist viharas in the past. He was able to point out the true identity of the images of Buddhas and Bodhisattvas which were being worshipped as Hindu gods or local deities. Villages such as Sari-chak, near Nalanda, had previously had an association with the Buddha's chief disciple Sariputta. Finally, he was able, by quoting passages from the Pāli texts, to demonstrate that Magadhi is still closely related to the Magadhi dialect.

After this visit, Kashyap offered to teach Pāli at Gaya College and at Nalanda College in Bihar-Sharif. Later, when the Bihar state government decided to start an institute for Pāli studies at Nalanda, he was the obvious choice to head the project. In 1951 the institute became the Nava Nalanda Mahavihara.

1956 was the 2500th anniversary of the parinibbana of the Buddha, celebrated by the Indian government as the Buddha Jayanti. As part of the celebrations, Kashyap's work of bringing out a Devanagari edition of the Pāli Canon was accepted as an official project and was jointly sponsored by the governments of Bihar and India. The first volume appeared in 1956 on the occasion of the Buddha Jayanti, and the rest followed over five years - guided to completion with enormous effort and marathon labour by Kashyap. At one point he sold his house to pay the salaries of workers when payments had been delayed.

During the Buddha Jayanti project, Kashyap returned to Varanasi and in 1959 was asked to become the first Professor of Pāli and Buddhism at the Sanskrit University of Varanasi. He remained there until 1965 when he returned to Nalanda for a second term as Director of the Nava Nalanda Mahavihara. He retired in 1973. Having earlier developed diabetes, he became seriously ill in 1974 and spent his last two years bedridden in the Japanese temple in Rajgir, from where he could see the Vulture Peak and the newly constructed Peace Pagoda. He died in 1976.
