= Nalanda Maha Vidyalaya =

Nalanda Maha Vidyalaya (English: Nalanda College) may refer to any of the following Madhya Maha Vidyalaya:

- Nalanda College, Colombo
- Nalanda Boys' Central College, Minuwangoda
- Nalanda Girls' College, Minuwangoda

== See also ==
- Madhya Maha Vidyalaya
