= Nalanda College =

Nalanda College may refer to:

- Nalanda College, Biharsharif, a college in Bihar Sharif, Bihar, India
- Nalanda College, Colombo, a government Buddhist school in Colombo, Sri Lanka
- Nalanda College of Engineering, situated in Chandi near Nalanda, Bihar, India
- Nalanda Medical College and Hospital, in Kankarbagh, Patna, Bihar, India
- Nalanda Maha Vidyalaya (disambiguation), collection of central colleges in Sri Lanka
