= Joyce Lambert =

Botanist (1916–2005)

Joyce Mildred Lambert
- Born: 23 June 1916; Herne Hill, London, England
- Died: 4 May 2005 (aged 88); Colney, Norfolk
- Education: Norwich High School for Girls
- Alma mater: University College of Wales, Aberystwyth
- Known for: The Making of the Broads
- Scientific career
- Fields: botany, ecology, stratigraphy
- Workplaces: Cambridge University; Southampton University

Joyce Mildred Lambert (23 June 1916 – 4 May 2005) was a British botanist and ecologist. She is credited with proving that the Norfolk Broads were man-made.

== Early life ==
Joyce Lambert was born on 23 June 1916 at 50 Oakbank Grove, Herne Hill, London. She was the daughter of Loftus Sidney Lambert, clerk for an electrical supply company, and later estate agent, and his wife, Mildred Emma, née Barker. She was brought up in Brundall, Norfolk, and was educated at Norwich High School for Girls.

In 1939, Lambert graduated in botany from the University College of Wales, Aberystwyth. After working as a schoolteacher in Norwich she was appointed lecturer in botany at Westfield College, London. The Norfolk naturalist A. E. (Ted) Ellis and the botanist A. R. Clapham (then at Oxford) who encouraged her in the 1940s to study the ecology of the fens bordering the River Yare in the Surlingham–Rockland St Mary area of Norfolk.

== Scientific discovery ==
She confirmed the theory of Clifford Smith that the Norfolk Broads were of man-made origin, the result of extensive peat-digging, and not a natural formation as the geomorphologist Joseph Newell Jennings had recently concluded. In 1952, JN Jennings's book, The Origin Of The Broads, was published by the Royal Geographical Society. Jennings concluded that most, if not all, of those lakes had been formed by natural processes.

In her study, Lambert used a stratigraphical technique: removing core samples of peat with a borer. Lambert used a borer with a narrow diameter and took many samples, revealing that the sides of the lakes were almost vertical and therefore man-made.

Research revealed that local parishes possessed "turbary rights" to dig peat in their own areas, which, Joyce established, coincided with the configurations of parish boundaries within the broads. It was also concluded that virtually all the excavations had been abandoned by the end of the 14th century as a result of their increasing susceptibility to flooding. This was caused partly by a deterioration in the East Anglian climate, and partly by a rise in the sea level. Where once there had been peat digging, there were now economically important fisheries.

She collaborated with Jennings and Smith on a further study of the Broads; their results were published in 1960 as The Making of the Broads: a reconsideration of their origin in the light of new evidence.

In 1950, Lambert had been appointed lecturer in botany at Southampton University. At Southampton, Lambert made a pioneering contribution to the use of computers in botanical science in her collaboration with her head of department, Bill Williams, on the multivariate analysis of plant communities.

The Norfolk Record Office holds a large collection of Dr Lambert's papers from the 1920s-2005, which includes drawings, maps, photographs and written works.

== Personal life ==
She was a life-long supporter of Norwich City football club. After her retirement in 1980 she returned to the house in Brundall (to the east of Norwich) that her grandfather had built in the 1920s. In the final three years of her life she moved to a nursing home, Oakwood House, in Old Watton Road, Colney, Norfolk. She died there on 4 May 2005 of bronchopneumonia. She never married.

== Publications ==
- J.N. Jennings, J.M. Lambert (1951). Alluvial stratigraphy and vegetational succession in the region of the Bure valley broads. Journal of Ecology 39 (1): 116–148. doi:10.2307/2256630.
- J.M. Lambert, J.N. Jennings, C.T. Smith, Charles Green, J.N. Hutchinson (1960). The Making of the Broads: a reconsideration of their origin in the light of new evidence. London: Royal Geographical Society; J. Murray.
