= Rockland Broad =

- Interactive map of Rockland Broad
- Location: England
- Coordinates: 52.594°N 1.442°E
- Type: Broad
- Surface area: 50 acres (20 ha)

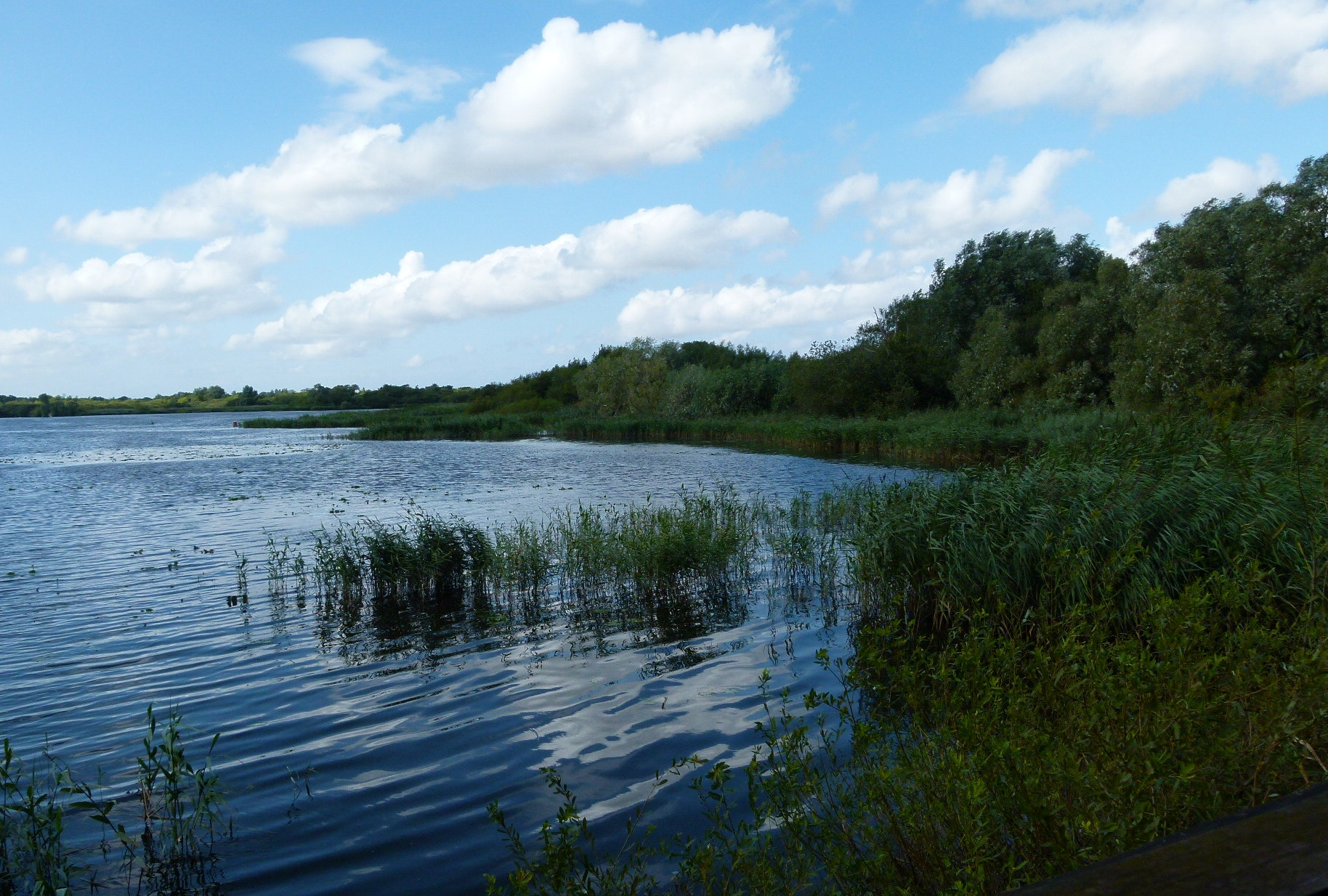
View from the hide at Rockland Broad

Rockland Broad is an area of open water, known as a broad, located north east of the village of Rockland St. Mary in the English county of Norfolk. The broad is in the Broads protected area. It comprises an area of approximately 50 acres (200,000 m^{2}) and is surrounded by marshland and tall reed beds. It is linked to the River Yare by two dykes, the Short Dyke and the Fleet Dyke.

From the village of Rockland St. Mary the broad can be reached via Rockland Staithe, opposite 'The New Inn'. The main navigable channel links the staithe to the Short Dyke. A footpath also leads from the staithe to an RSPB Bird hide which overlooks both the broad and the adjacent Rockland Marshes. Some parts of the broad are badly silted. In the western part of the broad, known as The Slaughters, lie two Norfolk wherry wrecks. There is also a channel on the western side which links to Wheatfen Broad.

The broad has good pike fishing and in 1912 it is said that a fish weighing thirty one and a half pounds was caught. There are also bream, roach, tench and perch.
