= Kirby Bedon =

Hamlet in Norfolk, England

Coordinates: 52.6005°N 1.3715°E

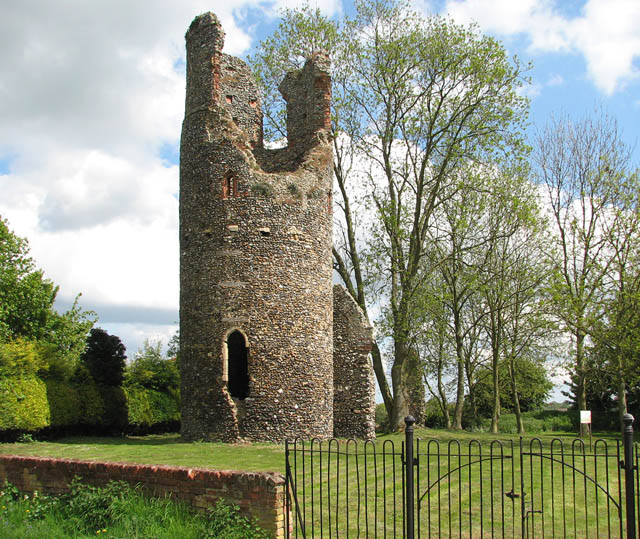
- Ruin of St Mary's church, Kirby Bedon

- Location within Norfolk
- Area: 7.82 km^{2} (3.02 sq mi)
- Population: 198 (2011)
  - Density: 25/km^{2} (65/sq mi)
- OS grid reference: TG28240560
- Civil parish: Kirby Bedon
- District: South Norfolk
- Shire county: Norfolk
- Region: East
- Country: England
- Sovereign state: United Kingdom
- Post town: NORWICH
- Postcode district: NR14
- Dialling code: 01508
- Police: Norfolk
- Fire: Norfolk
- Ambulance: East of England
- UK Parliament: South Norfolk

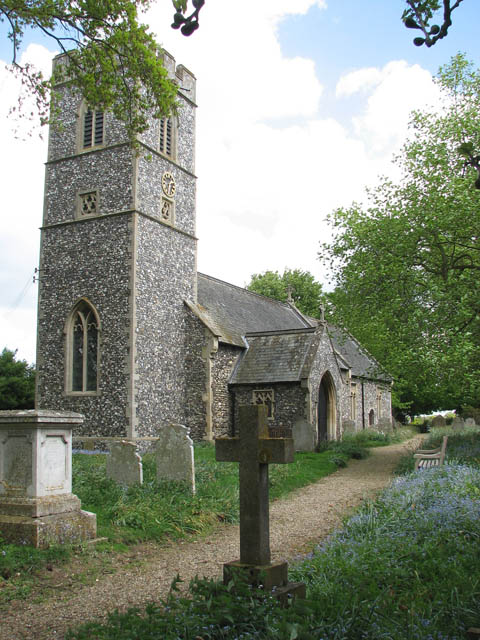
The church of St Andrew in Kirby Bedon

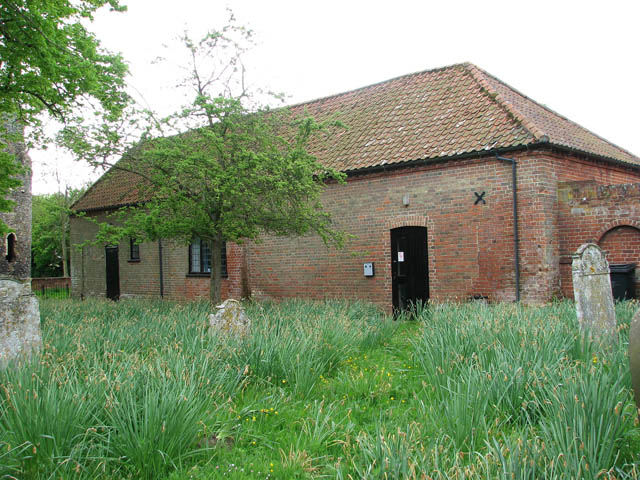
The church hall in Kirby Bedon

Kirby Bedon is a hamlet in South Norfolk which lies approximately 3½ miles (5½ km) south-east of Norwich on the road to Bramerton. It covers an area of 7.82 km^{2} (3.02 sq mi) and had a population of 186 in 77 households at the 2001 census, the population increasing to 198 at the 2011 Census.

The villages name means "church farm/village". The village was held by the Bidun family in the 12th century.

It has two churches, the ruined round-towered St Mary's Church and, standing opposite, St Andrew's church, which is still in use. St Andrew's contains a plaque erected by parishioners in memory of four crew members of "Broad and High", an American B-24 Liberator bomber who were killed when it crashed near the church on 18 August 1944 as it returned to Rackheath from a raid on Germany.

Kirby Bedon village school was open between 24 June 1878 and 26 July 1978, a victim of the drive to close small village schools.

Kirby Bedon has a historic link to the transatlantic slave trade through Sir John Berney (1757–1825) of Kirby Bedon Hall. He was the owner of Hanson Plantation, Barbados.

The village no longer has a pub; the Stracey Arms on the main road from Norwich to Bramerton closed in 1967. It is now a Caravan Club certified location.

Kirby Bedon Church Hall was the home venue of Kirby Bedon Short Mat Bowls Club from the late 1980s to 2017 when it disbanded. They were a very successful side which won the Norfolk Summer League on many occasions as well as many other cups and titles. They were the winners of the first ever National Club Championships in 2009.

Kirby Bedon is linked to Norwich by bus route 85 operated by Konectbus, providing nine services a day into Norwich and to the neighbouring villages of Bramerton, Surlingham and Rockland St Mary.
