= Lesingham House =

Coordinates: 52.6060°N 1.4259°E

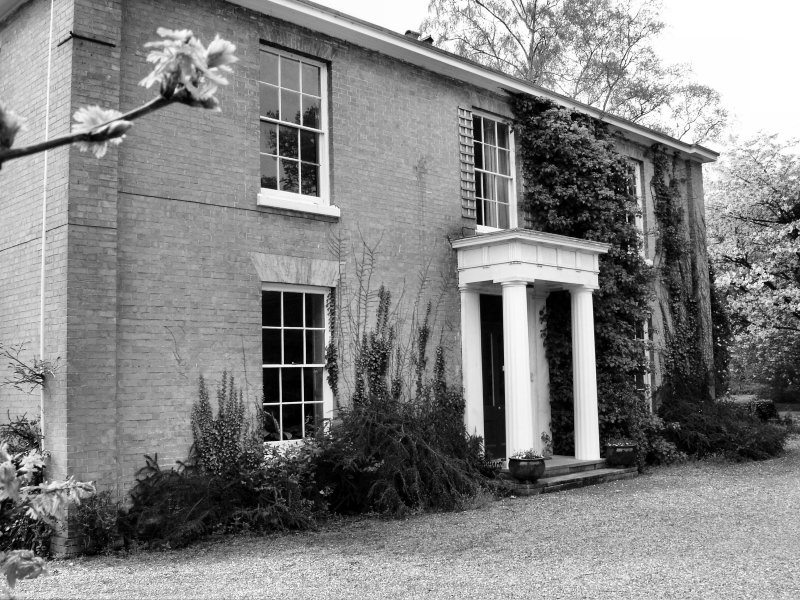
Lesingham House

Lesingham House is a country house in Surlingham, Norfolk, England, part of which was supposedly built in 1655.

== History ==
Lesingham House was supposedly built in 1655, and parts of the original structure may be included in the building we see today. A tablet in the house at the bottom of the staircase reads, “Lesingham House 1655 Rebuilt in part in 1834 by Gibbs Murrell”. It is recorded as belonging to Murrell in White's 1836 History, Gazetteer, and Directory of Norfolk.

It is possible that the building stood on the site of an older house owned by the Lesingham family who lived in Surlingham in the sixteenth century - perhaps the house owned by Thomas Wode, who died in 1588. Wode left at his death an inventory of goods indicating that his house in Surlingham had at least nine rooms and a stable. The Wode and the Lesingham families were related, and the families owned lands in Rockland and Bramerton as well as Surlingham. In his will Thomas Wode asked his late uncle Jeremy Lesingham to bury him in St Mary’s parish church. The Lesingham family is first found in Yorkshire where they were anciently seated as Lords of the Manor; migrants settled along the eastern seaboard of America from Newfoundland, to Maine, Virginia, the Carolinas, and to the islands.

By 1841 Lesingham House was owned by Gibbs Murrell, who lived here in some style as a farmer and brick- and tile-maker. The Murrells were an old Surlingham family who lived at Lesingham House for many generations. Their land was mostly in the centre of the village. With Gibbs Murrell lived his wife Catherine and his son Gibbs H. Murrell. Also living in the house at the time of the United Kingdom Census 1841 were Robert Roper, agricultural pupil, and two servants Mary Hannant and Ann Fish. The Lesingham House estate consisted of some 366 acres (148 ha) of “arable, pasture, water and marsh” as well as six houses or cottages. Lesingham House and estate was sold in 1861 for £16,895 pounds sterling.

By 1894 Lesingham House and Estate were in the hands of Sir Charles Rich of Devizes Castle, who died in 1913, after which they were occupied by a staunch Methodist couple, Mr and Mrs Richard Wright. The records show that the Trust of the Surlingham Chapel met under the newly appointed Rev. P. Webb, when Richard Wright, who farmed from Lesingham House, was made treasurer. Mr Wright made a donation of £50 which may have provided the purchase money required by the previous Wesleyan Trust.

The maps of this time show extensive outbuildings at Lesingham House, many of which are today used along with the house as accommodation for religious retreats. The Lesingham House property today has land of slightly less than 6 acres (2.4 ha). Records show field names for the original Lesingham House Estate were: Horse Pit Close, Share Water, Dawson’s’, New Close, Clay Pit Close, Green’s Croft, First Mill Piece, Further Mill Piece, Little Company, Great Company, Lombe Hills, Parker’s Close, Coldham Piece, Burd’s, Dormant’s.

Near Lesingham House, down Covey Lane, lie extensive marshes and the Ted Ellis nature reserve. This is one of the last remaining tidal marshes on the Broads and its wild remoteness encourages a variety of flora and fauna.

== Buddhist retreat centre ==
Since 1976, Lesingham House has been run as a Buddhist retreat centre called Padmaloka Buddhist Retreat Centre, which is affiliated to the Triratna Buddhist Community. It was established by the community's founder, Sangharakshita. It describes itself as "in essence, a Buddhist seminary, a semi-monastic religious community of men". The name Padmaloka means 'Realm of the Lotus' in Pāli, padma meaning lotus, and loka meaning realm, place, or abode.

The Padmaloka community is run by 13 men who are full time teachers and retreat leaders. The community aims to engage in work as a spiritual practice by bringing mindfulness to the tasks, and to that of the other retreatants. One feature of the centre is the Padmaloka stupa. This is said to contain relics of Dhardo Rimpoche, one of Sangharakshita's teachers. Its inscriptions read Cherish the Doctrine. Live united. Radiate love - which was Dhardo Rimpoche's motto.

== Prehistory ==
In 1974 a palaeolithic flint hand-axe was found in the Lesingham House garden.

== Address ==
Lesingham House, Covey Lane, Surlingham Norwich NR14 7AL
