= Dhardo Rimpoche =

Tibetan Buddhist philosopher (1917–1990)

Thubten Lhundup Legsang
- Born: 1917; Dhartsendo, eastern Tibet
- Died: 24 March 1990 (aged 73)
- Title: Dhardo Rinpoche or Dhardo Tulku (12th Dhardo Tulku in the Nyingmapa lineage, as well as 1st Dhardo Tulku in the Gelugpa lineage)
- Predecessor: Dhardo Tulku, 11th tulku of Dorje Drak Gompa
- Successor: Tenzin Legshad Wangdi (2nd Dhardo Tulku in the Gelugpa lineage)

Dhardo Rinpoche (1917-1990), born Thubten Lhundup Legsang, was the 12th in a line of tulkus from Dhartsendo on the eastern border of Tibet who hailed from the Nyingma Gompa in Dhartsendo called Dorje Drak (not to be confused with Dorje Drak in Central Tibet). The 11th tulku rose to the Abbot of Drepung and during the 1912 invasion of Tibet by China was the most senior of the retired abbots in the National Assembly. He died in 1916 and the 12th Tulku was born in 1917.

Dhardo Rinpoche was educated in the traditional Tibetan monastic style, taking his Geshe Degree and graduating at the Lharmapa level at Drepung Monastery, and doing further study at Gyud-med Tantric College. In 1951 he was appointed abbot of the Tibetan monastery at Bodh Gaya, and from 1954 onwards combined this with a few months per year stay in Kalimpong near the India-Tibet border. Kalimpong was to become an important staging post for Tibetans fleeing the Chinese invasion. Dhardo Rinpoche founded the Indo-Tibetan Buddhist Cultural Institute (ITBCI), in 1952 which then opened an orphanage and school for Tibetan refugees. He was abbot of Yiga Choeling Monastery, Ghoom from 1964 till his death in 1990.

During the 1950s and 1960s Dhardo Rinpoche was friend and teacher to Sangharakshita, an English Buddhist who spent 14 years based in Kalimpong before returning to England to found the Friends of the Western Buddhist Order (FWBO), now the Triratna Buddhist Community. Sangharakshita considered Dhardo Rinpoche to be a living bodhisattva and he is still revered as such in the Triratna Community. In the 1980s the FWBO's charity Aid For India (now known as the Karuna Trust (UK)) undertook to provide funding for the ITBCI School.

Portions of Dhardo Rinpoche's relics, the ashes from his cremation, have been installed in several stupas in the West: at Sudarshanaloka Retreat Centre (near Thames, New Zealand), at Padmaloka Buddhist Retreat Centre (near Norwich, England), at Guhyaloka Retreat Centre, (near Alicante, Spain), at Tiratanaloka Retreat Centre in Wales, at Vimaladhatu Retreat Centre in Sauerland, Germany, and at Aryaloka Buddhist Center in New Hampshire, USA.

Dhardo Rinpoche's motto was: "Cherish the doctrine; live united; radiate love", which also became the motto of the school he founded. He was concerned especially to teach the children at his school that "actions have consequences".

The thirteenth in the line of Tulkus, Tenzin Legshad Wangdi, was born in 1991 and still goes by the name of Dhardo Tulku.
