= Triratna Buddhist Community =

British Buddhist organisation

- Formation: 1967
- Type: Buddhist modernism
- Leadership: Triratna Buddhist Order
- Key people: Sangharakshita; Dharmachari Subhuti
- Website: www.thebuddhistcentre.com

The Triratna Buddhist Community, formerly the Friends of the Western Buddhist Order (FWBO), is an international fellowship of Buddhists. It was founded in the UK in 1967 by Sangharakshita (born Dennis Philip Edward Lingwood) and describes itself as "an international network dedicated to communicating Buddhist truths in ways appropriate to the modern world". In keeping with Buddhist traditions, it also pays attention to contemporary ideas, particularly drawn from Western philosophy, psychotherapy, and art.

Worldwide, more than 100 groups are affiliated with the community, including in North America, Australasia and Europe. In the UK, it is one of the largest Buddhist movements, with some 30 urban centres and retreat centres. The UK-based international headquarters is at Adhisthana retreat centre in Coddington, Herefordshire. Its largest following, however, is in India, where it is known as Triratna Bauddha Mahāsaṅgha (TBM), formerly the Trailokya Bauddha Mahasangha Sahayaka Gana (TBMSG).

The community has been described as "perhaps the most successful attempt to create an ecumenical international Buddhist organization". It has also been criticised for lacking "spiritual lineage", and has faced allegations of sexual exploitation and abuse during the 1970s and 1980s.

== Practices and activities ==
Meditation is the common thread through activities. Order members teach two practices: the "mindfulness of breathing" (anapanasati), in which practitioners focus on the rise and fall of the breath, and metta Bhavana, which approximately translates from the original Pali as "the cultivation of lovingkindness". These practices are felt to be complementary in promoting equanimity and friendliness towards others. Some friends of the Order may have little, if any, other involvement in its activities, but friendship, Sangha, and community are encouraged at all levels as essential contexts for meditation.

The founder, Sangharakshita, taught a system of practice emphasising five types of meditation. The first two, according to his system ('integration' and 'positive emotion'), can be correlated to the traditional category of "calmingsamatha" practices and the last two (spiritual death and spiritual rebirth) can be correlated to "insight" or vipassana practices. For those not ordained into the Triratna Buddhist Order, the practices associated with the first two are emphasised, though the spirit of the last two is also taught. The five types of meditation correspond to five 'stages' of the spiritual life.

These five stages are:

1. Integration: The main practice at this stage is the mindfulness of breathing, which is intended to have the effect of "integrating the psyche"—improving mindfulness and concentration and reducing psychological conflict.
2. Positive emotion: The second aspect of samatha is developing positivity—an other-regarding, life-affirming attitude. The Brahmavihara meditations, especially the metta bhavana or cultivation of loving kindness meditations, are the key practices intended to foster the development of positive emotion.
3. Spiritual death: The next stage is to develop insight into what is seen to be the emptiness of the self and reality. Meditations at this stage include considering the elements of which self and world are thought to be composed, contemplating impermanence (particularly of the body), contemplating suffering, and contemplating sunyata.
4. Spiritual rebirth: Triratna teaches that a person is spiritually reborn with the development of insight and the death of the limited ego-self. Among the main practices in this phase are visualisations of Buddhas and bodhisattvas. Each dharmachari ('farer in the dharma') is given an advanced visualisation meditation on a particular figure at ordination.
5. Receptivity and spontaneous compassionate activity: The practice associated with this phase is known as "just sitting" or "formless" meditation. Outside of meditation, this is the phase of "Dharmic responsiveness"—doing whatever needs to be done in any situation.

Centres also teach scripture, yoga and other methods of self-improvement, some of which are felt by some commentators to come from outside the Buddhist tradition. Recently, community activities have begun to include outdoor festivals, online meditation courses, arts festivals, poetry and writing workshops, tai chi, karate, and pilgrimages to Buddhist holy sites in India. For many years, the community charity Karuna Trust (UK) has raised money for aid projects in India.

As among Buddhists generally, Puja is a ritual practice at some events intended to awaken the desire to liberate all beings from suffering. The most common ritual consists of a puja, derived and adapted from the Bodhicaryavatara of Shantideva.

Retreats allow one to focus on meditational practice more intensely in a residential context outside a retreatant's everyday life. Community retreats can be broadly categorised into meditation retreats, study retreats, and solitary retreats. Retreat lengths vary from short weekends to one or two weeks.

Businesses that operate on the principle of "right livelihood" generate funds for the movement and seek to provide environments for spiritual growth through employment. Emphasis is placed on teamwork, and on contributing to the welfare of others: for example by funding social projects and by considering ethical matters such as fair trade. The largest community business was Windhorse: Evolution, a gift wholesaling business and a chain of gift shops. Windhorse: Evolution closed down in 2015.

Many cities with a Triratna centre also have a residential community. The first of these was formed after a retreat where some participants wanted to continue retreat-style living. Since it was felt that the most stable communities tended to be single-sex, this has become the paradigm for communities. Support from fellow practitioners in a community is seen to be effective in helping members make spiritual progress.

The largest Triratna centre in the UK is the London Buddhist Centre in Bethnal Green, East London, which offers drop-in lunchtime and evening meditation sessions each weekday, open to beginners, as well as courses and classes through the week. The centre's courses for depression, based on the mindfulness-based cognitive behavioural therapy methodology of Jon Kabat-Zinn at the University of Massachusetts Amherst, featured in the Financial Times in 2008. This initiative is supported by the local authority, the London borough of Tower Hamlets. The Times has also reported on the centre's work with those affected by alcohol dependency.

=== Triratna Refuge Tree ===
Sangharakshita developed a refuge tree for Triratna, so that members of the community could better develop a relationship with his spiritual inspirations, which come from a wide variety of Buddhist traditions.

The central figure is Shakyamuni, the historical Buddha. He is flanked by Dipankara, the Buddha of the past and Maitreya, the Buddha of the future. To the left of them is a company of five Bodhisattvas: Avalokiteśvara, Manjushri, Green Tara, Vajrapani, and Kṣitigarbha. To the right of the Buddhas sit five of his main historical disciples: Ānanda, Śāriputra, Maudgalyayana, Mahākāśyapa and Dhammadinna.

In front of the Buddhas, sits Sangharakshita surrounded by his eight main teachers: Dhardo Rimpoche, Jamyang Khysente Rimpoche, Chatral Rimpoche, Dilgo Khyentse Rimpoche, Dudjom Rimpoche, Kachu Rimpoche, Yogi Chen, and Bhikkhu Jagdish Kashyap. They are flanked by B. R. Ambedkar and Anagarika Dharmapala.

Behind the Buddhas, are a huge pile of Dharma texts. Above them sit the "teachers of the past". Japanese teachers: Hakuin Ekaku, Kūkai, Dōgen, Shinran. Chinese teachers: Huineng, Zhiyi, Xuanzang. Teachers of Tibet: Milarepa, Atiśa, Padmasambhava, Je Tsongkhapa. Indian teachers: Vasubandhu, Shantideva, Buddhaghosa, Nagarjuna, and Asanga.

Above them, sit the Five Tathāgatas: Akshobhya, Amitābha, Amoghasiddhi, Ratnasambhava, Vairocana. At the very top, Vajrasattva.

== Organisation ==
According to the community, six characteristics define it:

1. An ecumenical movement. It is not identified with any particular strand or school of Buddhism, but draws inspiration from many. It calls itself "ecumenical" rather than "eclectic" because it is founded on the premise that there is an underlying unity to all schools.
2. "Going for refuge" is central. "Going for Refuge to the Three Jewels" – meaning the Buddha, the Dharma, and the Sangha – is considered to be what makes someone a Buddhist.
3. A unified Order. Unlike some sangha, the community does not propagate a monastic lineage. Sangharakshita devised a non-monastic ordination system, whilst also allowing the undertaking of the "anagarika" precept which enjoins celibacy. Identical ordination is open to both sexes. While the movement regards single-sex activities as important to spiritual growth, men and women are recognised as being equally able to practice and develop spiritually.
4. An emphasis on spiritual friendship. There is a strong emphasis on the sangha, and spiritual friendship based on shared values. The community teaches that spending time with friends who share ideals, and engaging in ritual practice with them, supports ethical living and the arising of the bodhicitta.
5. Teamwork. Working together in teams, in the spirit of generosity and with a focus on ethics, is considered a transformative spiritual practice.
6. Importance of art. Engagement in, and an appreciation of, the arts are considered to be a valuable aspect of spiritual practice. The community teaches that a refinement of one's artistic tastes can help refine emotional sensitivity and provide a channel for the expression of right living, and spiritual growth. More broadly, the movement seeks ways to re-express Buddhism by making connections with sympathetic elements in the surrounding culture, regarding the arts as such an aspect of western culture.

"The FWBO's attitude to spreading the Dharma is one of heartfelt urgency," wrote Stephen Batchelor, a prominent British Buddhist author, in a book published in 1994. "For the FWBO, Western Society as such needs to be subject to the unflinching scrutiny of Buddhist values."

=== Triratna Buddhist Order ===
The Triratna Buddhist Order is the focal-point of the community, and is a network of friendships between individuals who have made personal commitments to the Buddha, the dharma and the sangha, in communion with others. Members are known as dharmacharis (masculine) or dharmacharinis (feminine), and are ordained in accord with a ceremony formulated by the founder. At ordination they are given a religious name in Pali or Sanskrit.

While there is an informal hierarchy within the order, there are no higher ordinations. A small number of members also take vows of celibacy and adopt a simpler lifestyle. Contrary to the traditional Buddhist structure of separating lay and monastic members, the order combines monastic and lay lifestyles under one ordination, similar to the practices which evolved in some Japanese schools of Buddhism. When members are ordained, they are given a white kesa to signify their ordination; golden kesas may be taken later by those choosing to make a public commitment to greater simplicity of lifestyle, including celibacy.

As with followers of the Shingon school of Buddhism, order members observe ten precepts (ethical training rules). These precepts are different from monastic vows and do not appear in the Vinaya Pitaka, but were formulated on the basis of the dasa kusala kamma ('ten wholesome actions'), commonly used in Mahayana Buddhism. The ten precepts are found in several places in the Pāli Canon, some Sanskrit sources, and the karma sections of the fundamental meditation texts of all four schools of Tibetan Buddhism.

Beyond this, a commitment to personal dharma practice and to remain in communication with other members are the only expectations. Ordination confers no special status, nor any specific responsibilities, although many order members choose to take on responsibilities for such things as teaching meditation and dharma. In mid-2008, there were around 1,500 members of the order, in more than 20 countries.

=== The wider community ===
In the Triratna community, as in the Theravada, Mahayana and Vajrayana traditions, sangha is interpreted as the Buddhist community as a whole. Someone who regularly attends community activities is considered to be a "friend". Friends do not have to regard themselves as Buddhists, and can be of any faith, or none. Some choose, after some time, to participate in a formal ceremony of affiliation, and thus become a "mitra." "Mitra" is Sanskrit for "friend", which in this case denotes a person who considers themselves Buddhist, who makes an effort to live in accordance with the five ethical precepts, and who feels that this spiritual community is the appropriate one for them.

Those who wish to join the Order must request this in writing. It will then take several years to prepare for ordination. This is an informal process, the focus of which is to deepen one's commitment. Some Friends, Mitras and Order members decide, at least for a while, to study teachings from outside the community, including non-Buddhist traditions such as Sufism.

== History ==
As the Friends of the Western Buddhist Order, the community was founded in London in April 1967 by Sangharakshita. He had then recently returned to England after spending two decades as a Buddhist and monk in India, following demobilisation from the British army. He had been born in south London as Dennis Lingwood, in August 1925. He would lead the organisation until his formal retirement in 1995, and would continue to exert a decisive influence on its thinking and practices thereafter.

In the 1990s, the order grew in India, and, according to the Encyclopedia of Buddhism, Indian members now make up about half the movement's formal membership. In a book published in 2005, the FWBO's members and supporters were estimated to number 100,000, the majority of whom were in India.

In 1997, the responsibility for ordination and spiritual leadership passed to a "preceptors' college", based in Birmingham. In 2000, the first chair of a preceptors' council was chosen by Sangharakshita. In future, this position will be elected by the WBO to five-year terms.

In 2003, the public preceptors, responding to feedback, decided to move away from a formal relationship to the order and movement, and to concentrate on the ordination of new order members, teaching and dharma practice. At the same time, to increase flexibility, the number of preceptors was expanded.

=== Name change ===
In the spring of 2010, the Western Buddhist Order and Friends of the Western Buddhist Order changed their names to the Triratna Buddhist Order (which approximates in English to the name used in India – Triratna Bauddha Mahasangha) and the Triratna Buddhist Community. Since its western foundation, the movement had spread to other parts of the world, including India where it was known by a different, non-western, name, and Indian members had long wished for a single name worldwide. An official history acknowledges this was controversial among some order members. ("Triratna" is a Sanskrit term meaning Three Jewels)

== Reception ==
=== Leadership ===
The Triratna Buddhist Community is not led by a guru, as in some traditions, but instead operates through what has been called a "friendly hierarchy". David V. Barrett says problems had occurred at FWBO centres as a result of poor leadership in the organisation's early days. For example, he says that the Croydon centre had suffered from the combination of authoritarianism that had developed there and the centre leader's charisma, prior to that leader's removal. In 1997, Stephen Batchelor, a prominent Buddhist commentator, said that the FWBO operated as "a self-enclosed system" and that their writings "have the predictability of those who believe they have all the answers".

Sangharakshita's spiritual lineage has also been questioned by author James William Coleman. Sangharakshita studied under, and in some cases received initiations from, eminent Buddhist teachers during his two decades in India, including Jagdish Kashyap, Dhardo Rinpoche, HH Dudjom Rinpoche, HH Dilgo Khyentse, and Jamyang Khyentse Rinpoche, but Coleman says that "he never worked closely enough with any teacher to be recognized as a dharma-heir".

=== 1997 Guardian report ===
In October 1997, a report by Madeleine Bunting, then the religious affairs correspondent of The Guardian, made wide-ranging allegations of sexual misconduct, dogmatism, and misogyny within the movement during the 1970s and 1980s. The report outlined three instances where men had reported feeling pressured or coerced into having same-sex relations within the FWBO.

Mark Dunlop, who had lived with the movement's founder for a number of years in the early 1970s and left the order in 1985, said that Sangharakshita had told him "that to develop spiritually he had to get over his anti-homosexual conditioning". An anonymous source alleged similar behaviour from the leader of FWBO's Croydon centre, whom he described as "a very powerful, intrusive personality and incredibly manipulative".

The mother of a former FWBO member, who had committed suicide in 1990 following a history of depression, also claimed sexual coercion within the community. A report by the man's clinical psychologist said that he felt "the community attempted to alienate him from his family and from women", and that he was encouraged to have same-sex relations "both by using inducements and by using threats".

At the time, the FWBO gave detailed responses in support of its founder. In a 2009 interview with a member of the group, Sangharakshita said about sex between him and students: "Perhaps in a very few cases they were not as willing as I had supposed at the time – that is possible." He said he did not see himself as "a teacher with a capital T", and said he was sorry "if there were any [sexual] encounters that were not satisfactory for the other person, whether at the time or in retrospect".

In 2010 the movement, by then named the Triratna Buddhist Community, published an official history which acknowledged the widespread concern among order members that, at least until the 1980s, the founder had misused his position as a Buddhist teacher to sexually exploit young men.

=== Views ===
Following The Guardian report in 1997, British Buddhists such as Ch'an teacher John Crook and FBWO member Vishvapani debated the attitudes and behaviours of the FWBO's leadership and the group as a whole. For example, The Guardian report's author interpreted statements by Sangharakshita as adverse to women and the family.

==== Women ====
In 2001, David V Barrett suggested that Sangharakshita's teachings and the order's single-sex communities may have led to misogynistic views among some male members, but that the organisation as a whole treated women equally. He noted that, when Sangharakshita stood down in 1993, three of the seven public preceptors names to lead the movement were women. That same year, James William Coleman said that Sangharakshita had expressed views found in early Buddhist texts that, at least in the early stages of their spiritual careers, men are more apt to commit themselves to the spiritual life than women, and that family life can be a distraction from spiritual attainment.

Scholars Sally Munt and Sharon Smith have suggested that Sangharakshita's belief in the practical and religious equality of women is tempered by his gender essentialism, and distrust of concepts such as the patriarchy, while placing him within the context of "liberal feminism" more broadly. They also said that many women found space for "mutual support" in the movement, which has resulted in more women than men being drawn to the order.

Munt and Smith have also described internal controversy when Sangharakshita's senior advisor, Dharmachari Subhuti, published his book Women, Men and Angels, in which he said that to be reborn as a woman was to be less spiritually able than to be reborn as a man. Coleman says that this argument drew on readings in older Buddhist texts. He also concluded, as would Stuart McLeod in 2005, that certain writings by Sangharakshita and Subhuti, which emphasised single-sex activities and "spiritual friendship", created the potential for misunderstandings or inappropriate behaviour.

==== Family ====
In 1994, Buddhist scholar Stephen Batchelor said the FWBO was well known for questioning assumptions about family life. In 1986, Sangharakshita had written that nuclear families and monogamous relationships could be sources of neurosis, leading to co-dependence.

Munt and Smith said the order's preference for single-sex organising, known as the "single-sex principle", simultaneously helped draw many individuals to the community due to the countercultural ethos of the times, but also marginalised women and was considered contentious within the order.

==== Sexuality ====
Sangharakshita's views of sexuality were also considered controversial. He suggested that order members should not "over-identify" with their sexuality and that men should strive to overcome any internalised homophobia that might prevent them from showing intimacy or affection to their male peers. In Subhuti’s official biography of the leader, Sangharakshita reportedly said that "men must break down their fear of homosexuality by facing the fact that there may be some element of sexual attraction towards their friends". According to the Encyclopedia of Buddhism:

Among the unique characteristics of the FWBO has been the open acceptance of homosexuality among the members. Order members have concluded that precept rules against abusing sexuality do not relate to the formal structure of sexual relations so much as to the nature of the relationship itself.

Munt and Smith suggest that while Sangharakshita's views on sexuality can be read in the context of anatta, or non-self, they might also be construed as "glossing over the potentially abusive sexual relations" Sangharakshita was engaged in with students. They also note that some critics have seen these views as part of a hypocritical rejection of celibacy and "promotion" of homosexuality.

=== 2016 abuse report ===
In September 2016, BBC News reported that former members of the Triratna movement claimed that they had been subject to sexual abuse by Sangharakshita at the group's retreat centre in Norfolk. Following discussion on social media, another former member claimed that he had been groomed for sex by another senior member of the order at the group's centre in Croydon in 1980s when he was 16 years old.

On 4 January 2017, following his treatment in hospital for pneumonia, Sangharakshita issued a statement expressing “deep regret for all the occasions on which I have hurt, harmed or upset fellow Buddhists, and ask for their forgiveness." On 19 January 2017, Triratna's leadership issued a statement in response to Sangharakshita's apology: “Consideration of some aspects of Bhante [Sangharakshita]'s past has been difficult for some of us in the College, as it has been for many of our brothers and sisters in the Order and others associated with our community. Bhante is the founder of our Order and Movement, and we feel enormous appreciation and gratitude to him for his teachings and inspiration – and yet at the same time we must acknowledge the effects of some of his past actions."

=== 2018 internal report ===
In October 2018, a group of members of the Triratna community released an internal report saying that more than one in 10 of them claim to have experienced or observed sexual misconduct while in the order, by Sangharakshita and other senior members. In July 2019, the group shared the report with The Observer newspaper.
