= Yogi Chen =

Chinese hermit

Chen Chien Ming (Chinese: 陳健民; pinyin: Chén Jiànmín; 1906–1987), also known as Yogi C. M. Chen or simply as Yogi Chen, was a Chinese hermit who lived in Kalimpong, India, from 1947 until 1972, when he moved to the United States, where he lived for the remainder of his life.

According to Ole Nydahl, Chen had, in his youth in China, been terrified of death and had at first practiced Taoist life-extending exercises. Later he turned to Buddhism and, in search of teachings, went to Tibet, where he spent several years living in a cave.

Sangharakshita regarded Chen as one of his teachers, and together with Khantipalo helped him compile Buddhist Meditation, Systematic and Practical. Both Sangharakshita and Khantipalo describe Chen as "eccentric."
