= Devapriya Valisinha =

Sri Lankan Buddhist activist

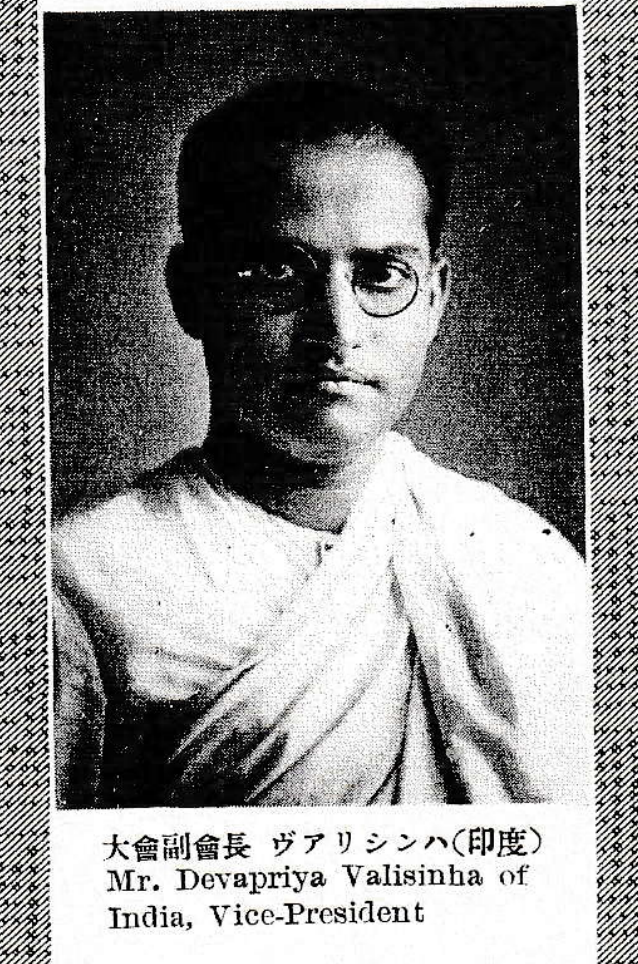
- Portrait of Valisinha published in the Proceedings of the Second General Conference of Pan-Pacific Young Buddhists' Associations (1935)

Personal life
- Born: February 10, 1904 Apalatotuwa village, British Ceylon
- Died: August 3, 1963 (aged 59) Colombo, Sri Lanka

Religious life
- Religion: Theravada Buddhist

Devapriya Valisinha (10 February 1904 – 3 August 1968) was a Sri Lankan Buddhist revivalist who served as the 2nd President (or General Secretary) of the Maha Bodhi Society for thirty-five years, from the death of his mentor (and the Society's founding president) Anagarika Dharmapala in 1933 until his own death in 1968.

== Early life and education ==
Devapriya Valisinha was born to a Sinhalese family in Apalatotuwa village (near Kandy) in Sabaragamuwa province, as the sixth child of seven. He and his siblings were orphaned at an early age and they were adopted by their grandfather, the village headman who descended from the aristocracy of Kandy. At the age of eight, Valisinha attended a talk by Dharmapala at the Udugama Temple along with other students from his school. Mysteriously, Dharmapala took an interest in the boy, which was interpreted as a karmic connection between the two. Dharmapala asked the grandfather if he could take young Devapriya to Colombo, where he would pay for his education at the Maha Bodhi College, a school that Dharmapala had founded. The family agreed, and Valisinha moved to Colombo, where he learned English and was cared for by Dharmapala's mother.

In 1917, Dharmapala's mother brought Valisinha to Calcutta, where Dharmapala lived and operated the Maha Bodhi Society (MBS). Realizing that Valisinha must become fluent in Bengali if he was to help administer the Maha Bodhi Society, Dharmapala enrolled 13-year-old Valisinha in the school of Rabindranath Tagore in Shantiniketan (later Visva-Bharati), north of Calcutta. Despite only studying there one year, Valisinha learned Bengali and was elected editor of Asram magazine and secretary of the literary association. It is said that during his time in Shantiniketan, Valisinha was exposed to Tagore's "spirit of universalism." He was the first Sri Lankan in the school's history. From this time, Valisinha began wearing Bengali dress and speaking normally in Bengali, with Dharmapala writing in his diary, "He is now like a Bengali boy of a good family."

== Early work for Maha Bodhi Society ==
Returning to Calcutta, Valisinha continued his studies at the Mitra Institution (Main) and began to help Dharmapala with the administration of the MBS. He assisted with the logistics of building the Sri Dharmarajika Chetiya Vihara in Calcutta to house a Buddha relic and participated in the opening ceremonies in 1920. He graduated with distinction from Mitra and entered Presidency College at the University of Calcutta in 1921.

In 1922, Valisinha became the de facto manager of the MBS headquarters in Calcutta as Dharmapala was away, attending business in Ceylon. Despite being only 18, "he was entrusted with almost all responsible work of the Society. He kept accounts, assisted Ven. Dharmapala in editing the monthly Maha Bodhi Journal, [was] in charge of managing the office in general[,] arranged Ven. Dharmapala's [twice-weekly] lectures," and helped transform the annual Vaisakha celebrations into well-attended religious festivals. He was also responsible for inviting Mahatma Gandhi to preside over the 1925 Vaisakha celebration.

Valisinha also became deeply involved with the MBS's titular project to restore Buddhist control over the ancient Mahabodhi Temple in Bodh Gaya, built on the site where Shakyamuni Buddha is said to have reached full awakening. In 1922, he attended the Gaya Congress, where he (along with other MBS delegates) promoted this project. It was there that he began to develop his long-standing relationship with Rahul Sankrityayan, who became a major ally in this project.

In 1926, Valisinha graduated with honors from Presidency College and enrolled in postgraduate studies.

== Time in England ==
In 1928, at Dharmapala's behest, Valisinha left his postgraduate studies in Calcutta to travel to London to manage a Buddhist mission that Dharmapala had founded the previous year, relieving Dharmapala's nephew, Dayananda Hewavitarne. He was accompanied by three Sinhalese monks. Valisinha "helped the bhikshus to form classes for the study of Pali, Buddhism, and meditation, and by his amiable disposition endeared himself to all with whom he came in contact." While in London, Valisinha also attended courses at the School of Oriental Studies, was elected treasurer of the British Maha Bodhi Society, and managed the monthly magazine British Buddhist. At this time, Dharmapala was in quite ill health, and Valisinha returned to India in 1930 to resume his duties as secretary of the Maha Bodhi Society, including the completion of the Mulagandhakuti Vihara in Sarnath.

== Mulagandhakuti Vihara ==
One of the major projects that Valisinha oversaw in his youth was the construction of the Mulagandhakuti Vihara in Sarnath, near Varanasi, on the site where the historical Buddha is said to have given his first sermons. Dharmapala had arranged for the MBS to receive land for this project from the British Raj and received funding from his chief benefactor, Mary Robinson Foster. Beginning in 1922 (at age 18), Valisinha became responsible for the vihara construction. There were several complications with the land grant and the original Ceylonese architect eventually quit the project, but Valisinha helped to see the project through.

After Valisinha returned from England, he returned to helping Dharmapala manage this project. The opening ceremonies were to be held on the full moon of November 1931, so Valisinha was frequently going back and forth between Calcutta and Sarnath to look after both wings of the Society's activities. He was able to get a British Buddhist, Mr. B. L. Broughton, who had come to India with him, to donate 10,000 rupees to pay for the painting the murals of the life of the Buddha by the Japanese painter Nōsu Kōsetsu. The opening ceremonies were attended by an estimated 15,000 people (including Indian National Congress president Jawaharlal Nehru and the prominent publisher Ramananda Chatterjee) making this "the largest Buddhist function held in India ... in living memory." With the blessings of Dharmapala (whose health had begun to decline), Valisinha founded a Buddhist school (the Maha Bodhi Vidyalaya), a library, and a free dispensary in Sarnath.

== General Secretary of the Maha Bodhi Society ==
Dharmapala had moved to Sarnath, living at the Vihara, and his health continued to decline. In July 1931, he took the lower ordination (Pabbajja) and on 16 January 1933 he took the higher ordination (Upasampada) in preparation for his death. At this time, Dharmapala appointed Valisinha as the second General Secretary of the Maha Bodhi Society.

In April, as the illness grew worse, Valisinha came from Calcutta to attend to his master on his deathbed. Dharmapala refused medicine, saying he wanted to be reborn so he could continue spreading the Buddhadharma in a new incarnation. Dharmapala's final word was, "Devapriya."

Following Dharmapala's death, Valisinha and Dharmapala's nephew, Rajah Hewavitarne, brought Dharmapala's ashes to Maligakanda Temple in Colombo, where 50,000 people gathered. Valisinha led the audience in a pledge that they would not rest "until Buddhagaya was restored to the Buddhists as a tribute to the memory of Ven. Dharmapala for his selfless services to the cause of Buddhism."

== International activities ==
In July 1934, Valisinha attended the Second General Conference of Pan-Pacific Young Buddhists' Associations, held in Japan, and was elected the conference Vice-President. He gave lectures about Buddhism and the MBS activities while in Japan, and, on the return trip, in Hong Kong, Shanghai, Singapore, and Penang. In 1938, he did another lecture tour in Burma, Singapore, Malaya, and Hong Kong.

In 1940, Valisinha welcomed the Chinese Buddhist reformer Taixu to Calcutta, delivering the welcome address at the MBS headquarters at a reception presided over by Calcutta's mayor. Taixu expressed appreciation for the work of the MBS but explained that Chinese Buddhists could not be of much help at that time due to the Japanese invasion. Despite Valisinha's ties to Japan and esteem for Japanese power, Valisinha's address "sympathized with the Chinese people during their period of crisis, expressing the hope that it 'will soon be over and China will again be in a position to play her glorious part for the welfare of the entire human race.' At the conclusion of the reception, Taixu presented a silver pagoda gifted by Chiang Kai-shek to the Maha Bodhi Society as “a token of China’s Goodwill."

Valisinha continued to be active in the international Buddhist community in the postwar period. He was associated with the World Fellowship of Buddhists since its founding in 1950, and was elected vice-president of the association multiple times. In 1958, he went on a lecture tour of Thailand, Cambodia, and Laos, and in 1959 he returned to Japan to participate in a conference for the 2500th Buddha Jayanti Celebrations.

== Decline and death ==
Valisinha developed a heart condition, which was attributed to his "strenuous activities" into his sixties. Shortly after a series of celebrations for the centenary of Dharmapala's birth, which extended from 1964 into 1965, Valisinha suffered from paralysis (possibly from a stroke) and never recovered. Three years later he was taken from India to Sri Lanka for medical treatment and he died in a hospital in Colombo on 3 August 1968. His remains were kept on public view at the headquarters of the Maha Bodhi Society in Colombo for three days, and many government officials, including Governor-General William Gopallawa and Prime Minister Dudley Senanayake, prominent citizens, and important Buddhist clergy came to pay their respects. Among those who made speeches at his funeral pyre were Senate President Abeyratne Ratnayaka, the eminent monk Ven. Palane Vajiragnana Thero, and the government official (and nephew of Dharmapala) Gamani Jayasuriya. Condolence messages were received from H.H. the 14th Dalai Lama, Indian Prime Minister Indira Gandhi, and many others.
