= London Buddhist Centre =

Buddhist temple in Tower Hamlets, London, England

Coordinates: 51.5281°N 0.0514°W

The London Buddhist Centre
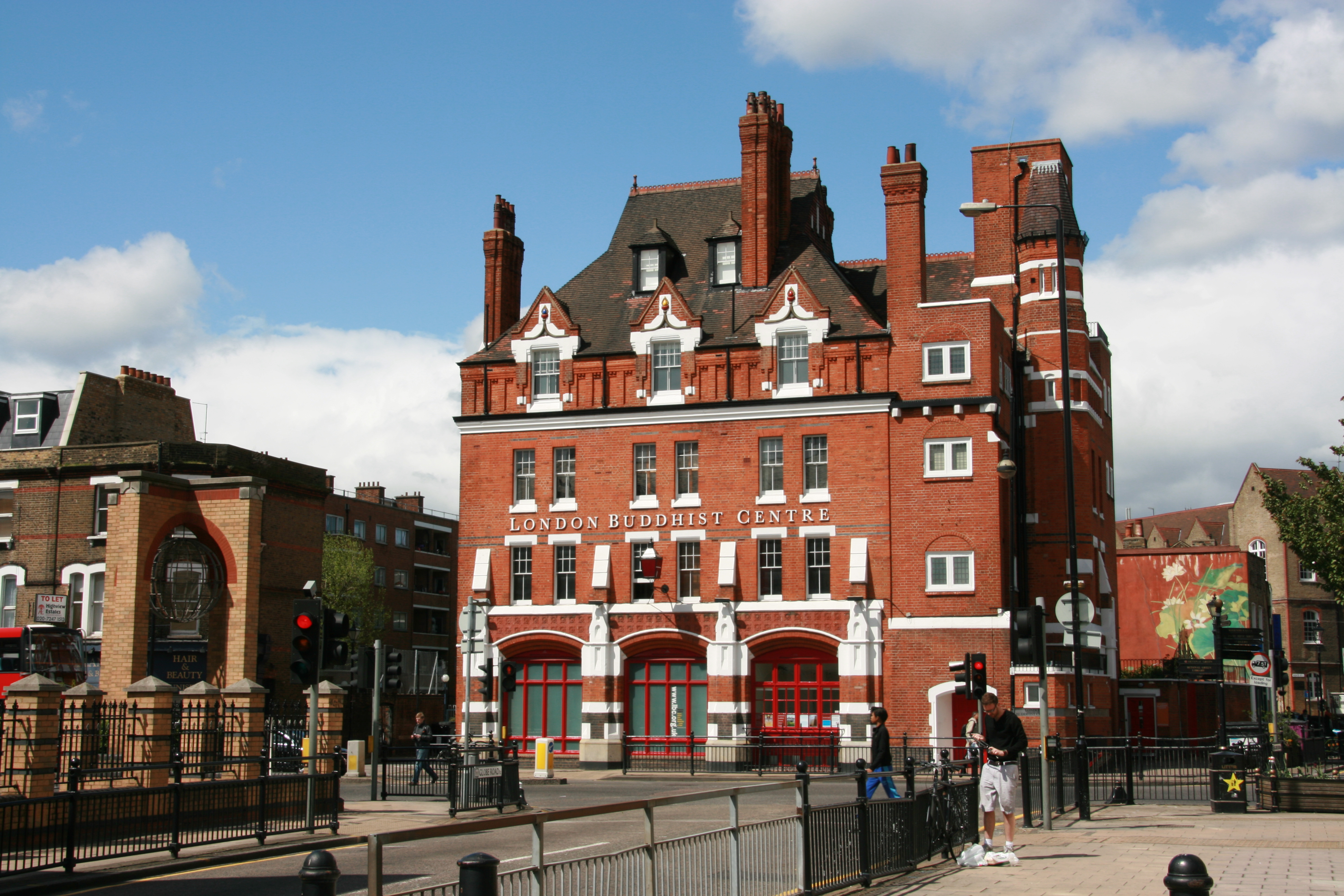
- 51 Roman Road, Bethnal Green, London E2 0HU

Listed Building – Grade II
- Official name: Fire Station, Roman Road, E3
- Designated: 26 September 1973
- Reference no.: 1065084

The London Buddhist Centre (LBC) is a temple located on Roman Road, Bethnal Green, London, that serves as the main base for the London Triratna Buddhist Community. It opened in 1978 in an ornate, vernacular redbrick former Victorian fire station that was completed in 1888 and in use by the London Fire Brigade until 1969. The building was fire-damaged in the 1970s before being renovated by volunteers for its current use. Further major improvements were completed in 2009.

The centre teaches meditation and Buddhism and offers drop-in lunchtime meditation sessions Monday through Saturday and evening sessions on Tuesdays and Wednesdays, open to beginners. It also explores the teaching of the Buddha (dharma) and its relevance in today's society through seminars, courses, classes, and retreats. Regular retreats are run at its retreat centre in Suffolk, Vajrasana.

In addition to this, the center also runs courses and retreats using mindfulness-based cognitive therapy approaches. Its courses for depression, based on the mindfulness-based cognitive behavioral therapy methodology of Jon Kabat-Zinn at the University of Massachusetts Medical School, featured in the Financial Times in 2008. The local authority supports this initiative, the London borough of Tower Hamlets. The Times has also reported on the centre's work with those affected by alcohol dependency.

The building's ground floor areas include a library, bookshop, and reception room, with painted murals, as well as two ornate shrine rooms with Buddha figures, or "rupas", sculpted by Chintamani, a member of the Triratna Buddhist Order. A third, basement, room for meditation and classes, primarily used by a project called "Breathing Space", opened in 2009. The building's upper floors house Buddhist residential communities.

The LBC is a UK-registered charity (255420), and is part of a local network of Buddhist businesses and organisations within the Bethnal Green area. This includes Buddhist communities, a charity shop, and an arts centre.

The former fire station is a Grade II listed building.
