= Nalanda (beetle) =

Scientific classification
- Kingdom: Animalia
- Phylum: Arthropoda
- Class: Insecta
- Order: Coleoptera
- Suborder: Polyphaga
- Infraorder: Elateriformia
- Superfamily: Buprestoidea
- Family: Buprestidae
- Genus: Nalanda; Thery, 1904

Genus of beetles

Nalanda is a genus of beetles in the family Buprestidae, containing the following species:

- Nalanda acuta (Bourgoin, 1924)
- Nalanda alberti Descarpentries & Villiers, 1967
- Nalanda albopubens Descarpentries & Villiers, 1967
- Nalanda amethystina Descarpentries & Villiers, 1967
- Nalanda angustifrons Descarpentries & Villiers, 1967
- Nalanda annamita Descarpentries & Villiers, 1967
- Nalanda arrowi (Bourgoin, 1924)
- Nalanda atrata Descarpentries & Villiers, 1967
- Nalanda aureopubens Descarpentries & Villiers, 1967
- Nalanda bilyi Ohmomo & Akiyama, 1989
- Nalanda binhensis Descarpentries & Villiers, 1967
- Nalanda blaoensis Descarpentries & Villiers, 1967
- Nalanda buddhaica (Obenberger, 1931)
- Nalanda choganhensis Descarpentries & Villiers, 1967
- Nalanda chrysomelinus (Kerremans, 1892)
- Nalanda cochinchinae (Obenberger, 1924)
- Nalanda coeruleiventris Descarpentries & Villiers, 1967
- Nalanda convexifrons Descarpentries & Villiers, 1967
- Nalanda coomaniana Descarpentries & Villiers, 1967
- Nalanda cupreiventris Descarpentries & Villiers, 1967
- Nalanda cupreoapicalis Descarpentries & Villiers, 1967
- Nalanda cupricollis (Saunders, 1866)
- Nalanda cyaneoscutellaris (Bourgoin, 1924)
- Nalanda cyaneus (Fisher, 1922)
- Nalanda dalatensis Descarpentries & Villiers, 1967
- Nalanda delauneyi (van de Poll, 1892)
- Nalanda dessumi Descarpentries & Villiers, 1967
- Nalanda dongnaiensis Descarpentries & Villiers, 1967
- Nalanda exophtalma Descarpentries & Villiers, 1967
- Nalanda fleutiauxi (Bourgoin, 1924)
- Nalanda formosana (Obenberger, 1944)
- Nalanda frontalis Descarpentries & Villiers, 1967
- Nalanda glabra (Fisher, 1921)
- Nalanda granulata Descarpentries & Villiers, 1967
- Nalanda halperini Niehuis, 1997
- Nalanda harmandi (Baudon, 1962)
- Nalanda hideoi Ohmomo & Akiyama, 1989
- Nalanda horni Théry, 1904
- Nalanda komiyai Ohmomo & Akiyama, 1989
- Nalanda kurosawai Tôyama, 1986
- Nalanda kurosawana Ohmomo & Akiyama, 1989
- Nalanda lacthoensis Descarpentries & Villiers, 1967
- Nalanda lagerstraemiae Ohmomo & Akiyama, 1989
- Nalanda laotica (Bourgoin, 1924)
- Nalanda latifrons Descarpentries & Villiers, 1967
- Nalanda magnifica (Kerremans, 1892)
- Nalanda mandarina (Obenberger, 1927)
- Nalanda moi Descarpentries & Villiers, 1967
- Nalanda muong Descarpentries & Villiers, 1967
- Nalanda niisatoi Ohmomo & Akiyama, 1989
- Nalanda ohbayashii Kurosawa, 1957
- Nalanda ornatus (Fisher, 1921)
- Nalanda pentacallosa Ohmomo & Akiyama, 1989
- Nalanda perroti Descarpentries & Villiers, 1967
- Nalanda rutilicollis (Obenberger, 1914)
- Nalanda sericea Descarpentries & Villiers, 1967
- Nalanda shimomurai Ohmomo & Akiyama, 1989
- Nalanda suzukii Ohmomo & Akiyama, 1989
- Nalanda takashii Ohmomo & Akiyama, 1989
- Nalanda tonkinea Descarpentries & Villiers, 1967
- Nalanda toyamai Ohmomo & Akiyama, 1989
- Nalanda viridipennis (Fisher, 1921)
- Nalanda vitalisi (Bourgoin, 1924)
- Nalanda wenigi (Obenberger, 1927)
