= Rockland St Mary =

Village in Norfolk, England

Coordinates: 52.58514°N 1.41177°E

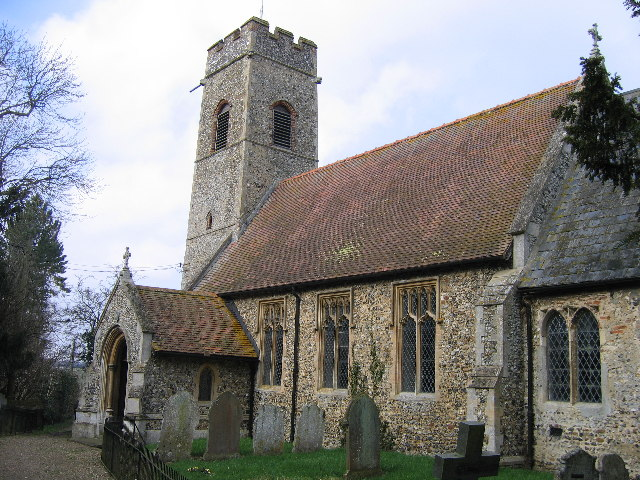
- St. Mary's Church, Rockland St Mary

- Location within Norfolk
- Area: 5.50 km^{2} (2.12 sq mi)
- Population: 810 (2011)
  - Density: 147/km^{2} (380/sq mi)
- OS grid reference: TG311041
- Civil parish: Rockland St Mary
- District: South Norfolk
- Shire county: Norfolk
- Region: East
- Country: England
- Sovereign state: United Kingdom
- Post town: Norwich
- Postcode district: NR14
- Dialling code: 01508
- Police: Norfolk
- Fire: Norfolk
- Ambulance: East of England
- UK Parliament: South Norfolk

Rockland St Mary is a village in South Norfolk which lies about 6 miles (9½ km) southeast of Norwich between Surlingham, Bramerton, Claxton and Hellington. In the 2001 census it contained 325 households and a population of 824, falling to 810 at the 2011 Census. Although Rockland is part of South Norfolk District, those parts of the village lying adjacent to the river and broads fall under the administration of the Broads Authority. The Street (pictured) runs east to west through the centre of the village.

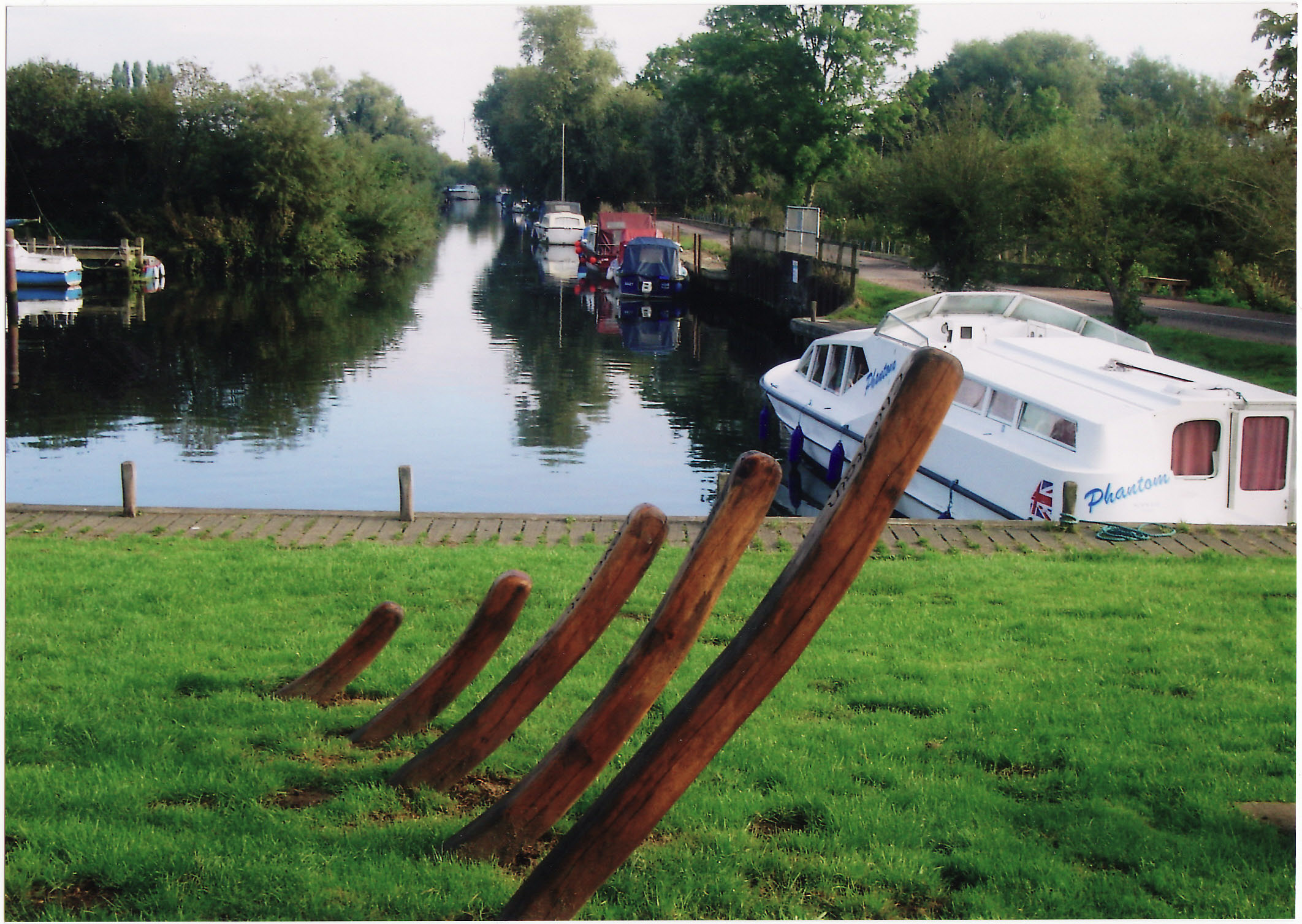
Rockland staithe with remnants of a Norfolk wherry in foreground

== History ==
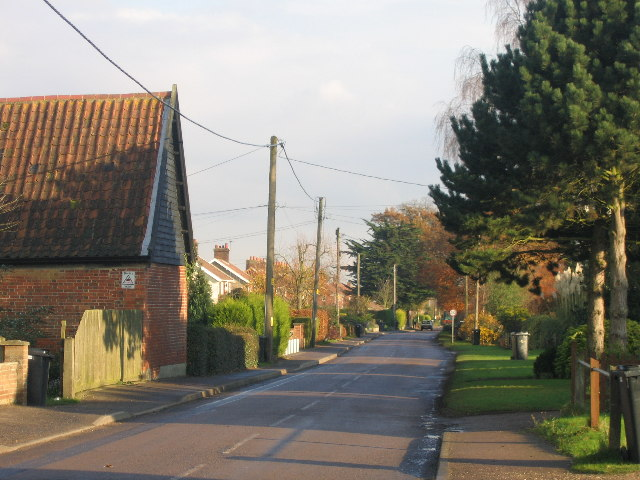
The Street, Rockland St Mary; looking east from opposite Rockland stores and the Post Office

Rockland St Mary dates back to the Anglo-Saxon period with the village mentioned in the Domesday Book as Rokelunda. The name Rokelunda derives from Old Norse for 'Rook Grove'. In medieval times Norwich was noted for its black-glazed roofing tiles which were made in Rockland and transported by river from the staithe. Although all trace of the tile-making industry has gone Rockland Staithe still exists, providing mooring for pleasure craft opposite The New Inn at the east end of the village. It leads to Rockland Broad which is itself linked to the River Yare by two dykes: the Short Dyke and the Fleet Dyke. The school has occupied the same site since the 1840s, the current buildings date from the 1880s and were built using bricks baked in the village. During World War II a V-2 rocket hit a field near the school. This caused several minor injuries and one major injury. A new extension was opened in September 2004 by MP Richard Bacon which was built from Suffolk bricks.

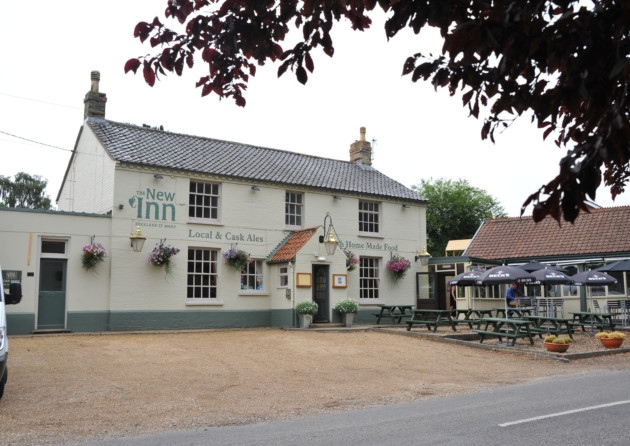
The New Inn pub

== Today ==
As well as the New Inn, the village contains Rockland Stores and Post Office and a doctors' surgery. Rockland St. Mary Primary School provides education for around 90 children. The village also has two halls, the Margaret Mac, and the Parish Hall.

== St Mary's Church ==
St Mary's church has a noticeably tapered tower, Tudor windows and a Victorian interior. It also contains a bronze memorial to those who both served and died in World War I. The churchyard supposedly contains the overgrown remains of Rockland St Margaret.

== Public access ==
The village is served by bus route 85 via Konectbus, which provides nine services a day into Norwich via Bramerton and Kirby Bedon.

National Cycle Route 1 passes through the east of the village on its route from Norwich via Whitlingham and Surlingham, and out to Loddon and Beccles via Claxton. Long distance footpath, Wherryman's Way lies close to the village

== Governance ==
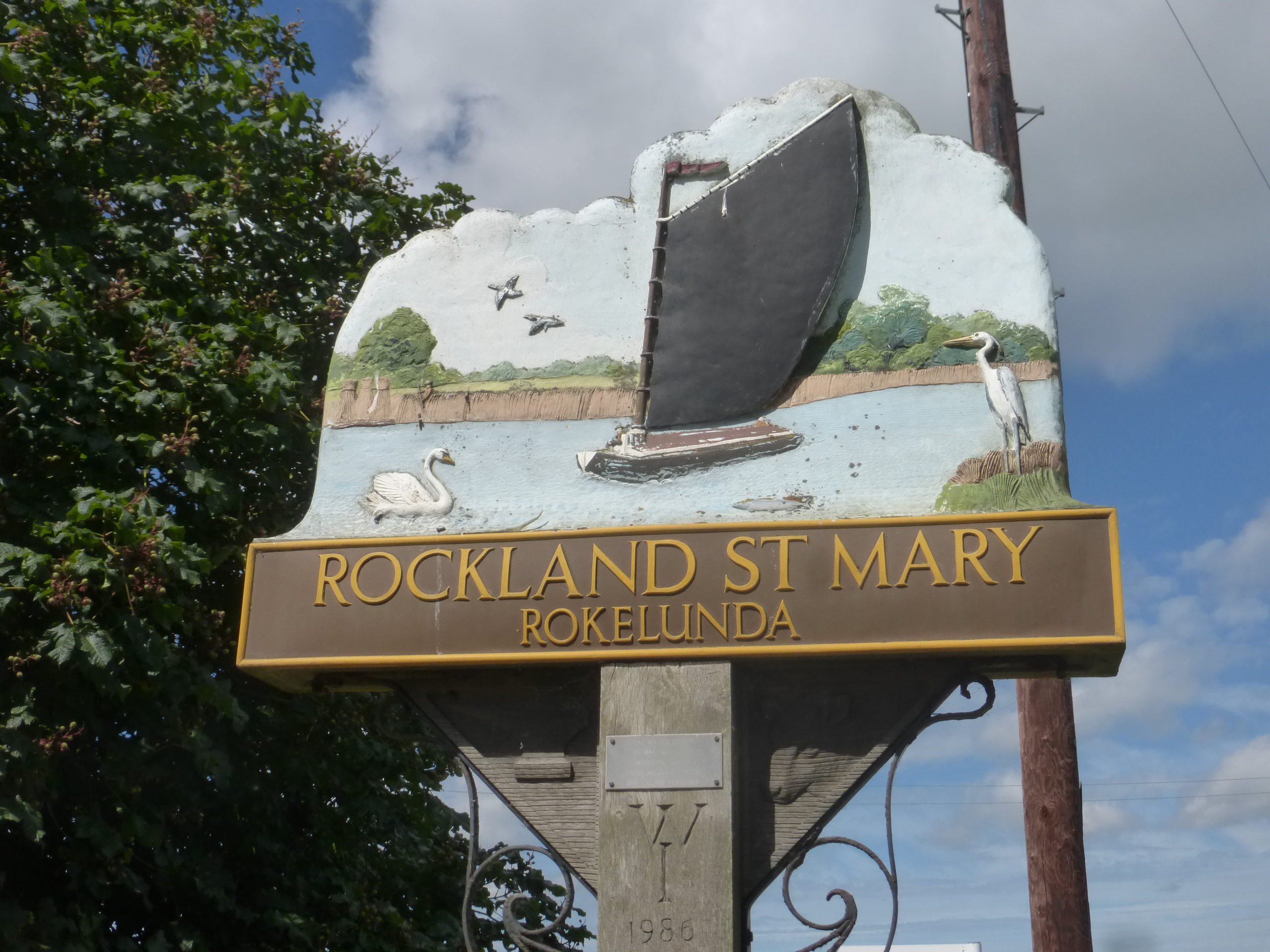
Rockland St Mary village sign

Rockland St Mary is part of the electoral ward called Rockland. The population of this ward at the 2011 Census was 2,839.
