= Nalanda Boys' Central College =

Nalanda Boys' Central College – Minuwangoda
- නාලන්දා (පිරිමි) මධ්‍ය විද්‍යාලය, මිනුවන්ගොඩ
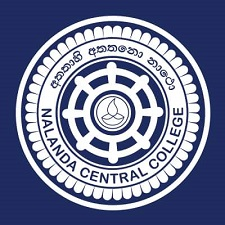

Location
- Minuwangoda; Sri Lanka
- Coordinates: 7°10′11″N 79°57′05.8″E

Information
- Type: National School
- Motto: "අත්තාහි අත්තනෝ නාථෝ"; Pali: "Aththahi Aththano Natho" (One is the master of oneself)
- Religious affiliation: Theravada Buddhism
- Established: 5 October 1939; 86 years ago
- Founder: Ven. Heenatiyana Dhammaloka
- School district: Gampaha
- Category: Government School
- Principal: K. D. C. Ruwan Kumara
- Grades: Class 1 - 13
- Gender: Boys
- Enrollment: 6,000
- Colours: Blue and white
- Alumni: Old Nalandians • Nalanda Friends
- Website: nalandaboys.lk

Nalanda Boys' Central College – Minuwangoda - Minuwangoda Sinhala: නාලන්දා (පිරිමි) මධ්‍ය විද්‍යාලය - මිනුවන්ගොඩ was the fourth central college in Sri Lanka, according to a concept of C. W. W. Kannangara. Nalanda College – Minuwangoda is a government Buddhist school in Sri Lanka, and was founded in 1939.

== History ==
During Second World War in 1939 one part of Nalanda College, Colombo was taken to Minuwangoda and other part to Maharagama. After the end of the war it returned to its original site and Minuwangoda Nalanda Maha Vidyalaya was established here with the guidance of Venerable Heenatiyana Dhammaloka Thero.

== Alumni ==
The Minuwangoda Nalanda Central College Old Boys Association is the alumni association of the school.

=== School houses ===
Students are divided into four houses, whose names are derived from Sinhala language.

House	Colour Code	In Sinhala
Gamunu		ගැමුණු නිවාසය.
Parakrama		පරාක්‍රම නිවාසය.
Vijaya		විජය නිවාසය.
Thissa		තිස්ස නිවාසය.

== Cadet contingent ==
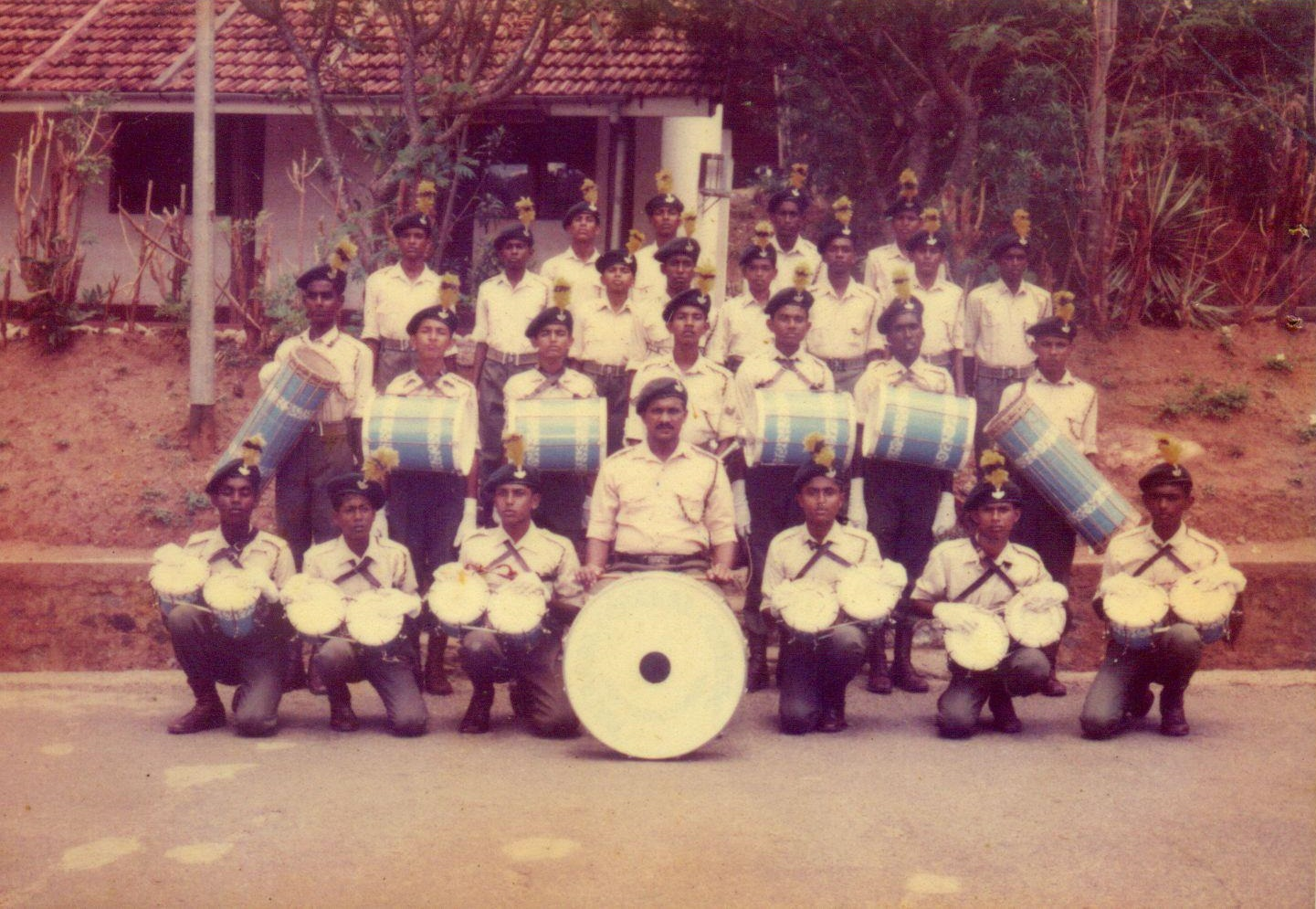
The first time to attend the band assessment camp its in year 1993

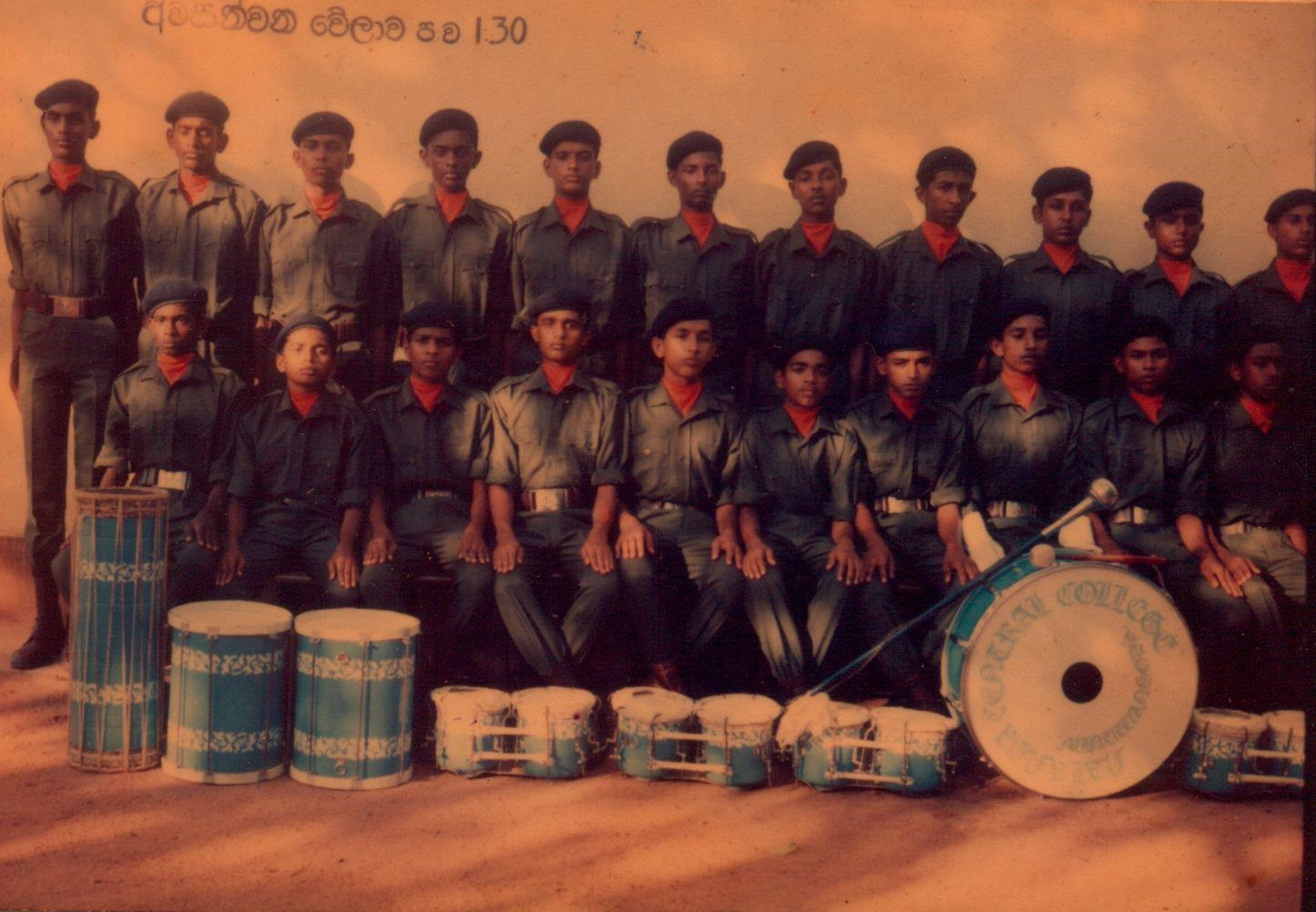
First ever day band members to wear a uniform.

The cadet band was formed in 1992. It trains school cadets under the 7 Battalion of National Cadet Corps. It was formed under the guidance of the principal, V. V. Munasinghe, Major Ratnamalala and Captain Sandaruwan, who was the CO and Adjutant of 7NCC respectively at that time. The cadet contingent has won the Herman Loose Trophy on a number of occasions.

== See also ==
- Nalanda Girls' College
