= Sangharakshita =

British spiritual teacher and writer (1925–2018)

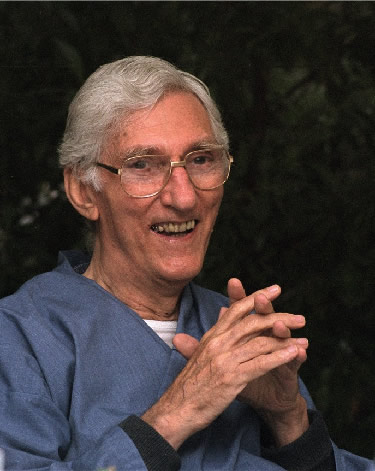
- Born: Dennis Philip Edward Lingwood; 26 August 1925; Tooting, London, England
- Died: 30 October 2018 (aged 93); Hereford, Herefordshire, England
- Occupations: Spiritual teacher; writer
- Organization: Friends of the Western Buddhist Order (now Triratna Buddhist Community)
- Website: sangharakshita.org

Dennis Philip Edward Lingwood (26 August 1925 – 30 October 2018), known more commonly as Sangharakshita, was a British spiritual teacher and writer. In 1967, he founded the Friends of the Western Buddhist Order (FWBO), which was renamed the Triratna Buddhist Community in 2010.

Sangharakshita was and remains a highly controversial figure. For his supporters, he was a spiritual pioneer who introduced Eastern religious teachings to the West. For his detractors, he was a sexual predator who used his position to abuse vulnerable young men.

== Life ==
=== Early life ===
Sangharakshita was born Dennis Philip Edward Lingwood on 26 August 1925 in Tooting, London. After being diagnosed with a heart condition he spent much of his childhood confined to bed, and used the opportunity to read widely. His first encounter with non-Christian thought was with Madame Helena Blavatsky's Isis Unveiled, upon reading which, he later said, he realised that he had never been a Christian. The following year he came across two Buddhist texts, the Diamond Sutra and the Platform Sutra, and concluded that he had always been a Buddhist.

As Dennis Lingwood, he joined the Buddhist Society at the age of 18, and formally became a Buddhist in May 1949 by taking the Three Refuges and Five Precepts from the Burmese monk, U Thittila.

He was conscripted into the army in 1943, and served in India, Ceylon, now known as Sri Lanka, and Singapore as a radio engineer in the Royal Corps of Signals. It was in Ceylon, while in contact with the swamis in the (Hindu) Ramakrishna Mission, that he developed the desire to become a monk. In 1946, after the cessation of hostilities, he was transferred to Singapore, where he made contact with Buddhists and learned to meditate.

=== India ===
Having been conscripted into the British Army and posted to India, at the end of the war Sangharakshita handed in his rifle, left the camp where he was stationed and deserted. He moved about in India for a few years, with a Bengali novice Buddhist, the future Buddharakshita, as his companion, meditating and experiencing for himself the company of eminent spiritual personalities of the times, like Mata Anandamayi, Ramana Maharishi and Swamis of Ramakrishna Mission. They spent fifteen months in 1947–48, in the Ramakrishna Mission centre at Muvattupuzha with the consent of Swami Tapasyananda and Swami Agamananda. In May 1949 he became a novice monk, or sramanera, in a ceremony conducted by the Burmese monk, U Chandramani, who was then the most senior monk in India. It was then that he was given the name Sangharakshita (Pali: Sangharakkhita), which means "protected by the spiritual community." Sangharakshita took full bhikkhu ordination the following year, with another Burmese bhikkhu, U Kawinda, as his preceptor (upādhyāya), and with the Ven. Jagdish Kashyap as his teacher (ācārya). He studied Pali, Abhidhamma, and Logic with Jagdish Kashyap at Benares (Varanasi) University. In 1950, at Kashyap's suggestion, Sangharakshita moved to the hill town of Kalimpong close to the borders of India, Bhutan, Nepal. and Sikkim, and only a few miles from Tibet. Kalimpong was his base for 14 years until his return to England in 1966.

During his time in Kalimpong, Sangharakshita formed a young men's Buddhist association and established an ecumenical centre for the practice of Buddhism (the Triyana Vardhana Vihara). He also edited the Maha Bodhi Journal and established a magazine, Stepping Stones. In 1951, Sangharakshita met the German-born Lama Govinda, who was the first Buddhist Sangharakshita had known "to declare openly the compatibility of art with the spiritual life", and who gave Sangharakshita a greater appreciation for Tibetan Buddhism. Govinda had begun his explorations of Buddhism in the Theravada tradition, studying briefly under the German-born bhikkhu, Nyanatiloka Mahathera (who gave him the name Govinda), but after meeting the Gelug Lama, Tomo Geshe Rinpoche, in 1931, he turned towards Tibetan Buddhism. Sangharakshita's spiritual explorations were to follow a similar trajectory.

Sangharakshita was ordained in the Theravada school, but said he became disillusioned by what he felt was the dogmatism, formalism, and nationalism of many of the Theravadin bhikkhus he met and became increasingly influenced by Tibetan Buddhist teachers who had fled Tibet after the Chinese invasion in the 1950s. Two years after his meeting with Lama Govinda he began studying with the Gelug Lama, Dhardo Rinpoche. Sangharakshita also received initiations and teachings from teachers who included Jamyang Khyentse, Dudjom Rinpoche, as well as Dilgo Khyentse Rinpoche. It was Dhardo Rinpoche who was to give Sangharakshita Mayahana ordination. Later, Sangharakshita also studied with a Ch'an teacher, Yogi Chen (Chen Chien-Ming), along with another English monk, Bhikkhu Khantipalo. Together, the three men turned their ongoing seminar on Buddhist theory and practice into a book, Buddhist Meditation, Systematic and Practical.

Sangharakshita was an associate of B. R. Ambedkar. In 1952, Sangharakshita met Bhimrao Ramji Ambedkar (1891–1956), the chief architect of the Indian constitution and India's first law minister. Ambedkar, who had been a so-called Untouchable, converted to Buddhism, along with 380,000 other Untouchables (now known as "dalits") on 14 October 1956. Ambedkar and Sangharakshita had been in correspondence since 1950, and the Indian politician had encouraged the young monk to expand his Buddhist activities. Ambedkar appreciated Sangharakshita's "commitment to a more critically engaged Buddhism that did not at the same time dilute the cardinal precepts of Buddhist thought". Ambedkar initially invited Sangharakshita to perform his conversion ceremony, but the latter refused, arguing that U Chandramani should preside. Ambedkar died six weeks later, leaving his conversion movement leaderless, and Sangharakshita, who had just arrived in Nagpur to visit dalit Buddhists, continued what he felt was Ambedkar's work by lecturing to former Untouchables, and presiding over a ceremony in which a further 200,000 Untouchables converted. For the next decade, Sangharakshita spent much of his time visiting dalit Buddhist communities in western India.

=== Return to the West ===
In 1964, Sangharakshita was invited to help with a dispute at the Hampstead Buddhist Vihara in north London, where he proved to be a popular teacher. His ecumenical approach and failure to conform to some of the trustees' expectations was said to contrast with the strict Theravadin-style Buddhism at the vihara. Although originally planning to stay only six months, he decided to settle in England, but after he returned to India for a farewell tour, the Vihara's trustees voted to expel him.

Sangharakshita returned to England and in April 1967 founded the Friends of the Western Buddhist Order. The Western Buddhist Order was founded a year later, when he ordained the first dozen men and women. The first ordinations were attended by a Zen monk, a Shin priest and two Theravadin monks.

Satisfied neither with the lay-Buddhist approach of the Buddhist Society, nor the monastic approach of the Hampstead vihara—the two dominant Buddhist organisations in Britain at that time—he created what he said was a new form of Buddhism. The order would be neither lay nor monastic, and members take a set of ten precepts that are a traditional part of Mahayana Buddhism.

Initially, Sangharakshita led all classes and conducted all ordinations. He gave lectures drawing on what he felt were the essential teachings of all the major Buddhist schools. He led major retreats twice a year and frequent day and weekend events. As the order grew, and centres became established across Britain and in other countries, order members took more responsibility until, in August 2000, he devolved his responsibilities as the head of the Western Buddhist Order to eight men and women who formed what was called the "College of Public Preceptors." In 2005 Sangharakshita donated all of his books and artefacts, with an insurance value of £314,400, to the charitable trust dedicated to his 'support and assistance' as well as enabling his office to 'maintain contact with his disciples and friends worldwide' and to 'support them in activities'. In 2015 this trust had an income of £140K, and for 2016 it was £73K.

Sangharakshita died of pneumonia and sepsis on 30 October 2018, at the age of 93.

== Allegations of sexual coercion and abuse ==
In 1997, Sangharakshita became the focus of controversy when The Guardian newspaper published complaints concerning some of his sexual relationships with FWBO members during the 1970s and 1980s. For a decade following these public revelations, he declined to give any response to concerns from within the movement that he had misused his position as a Buddhist teacher to exploit young men sexually. In 2010, it was reported that he had addressed the controversy, stressing that his sexual partners were, or appeared to be, willing, and he expressed regret for any mistakes.

In 2016 a local BBC channel showed a report based on interviews with three men, one under the age of consent for sex between men at the time (21), who claimed they had been pressured into having sex with Sangharakshita. They were reportedly told it would help them "make spiritual progress" to have same-sex relations despite being heterosexual. In 2017 the Triratna Buddhist Order hired an accredited facilitator to work directly with any individuals feeling harmed as a result of past sexual involvement with Sangharakshita.

In 2020, a group within the Order published a report resulting from investigations into these allegations aiming to "establish the facts related to Sangharakshita's sexual behaviour". The report included acknowledgements that Sangharakshita did "not always recognise the power imbalance between student and teacher" and that he "was not always willing or able to have meaningful dialogue after the sexual involvement had ended".

== Contributions and legacy ==
Sangharakshita has been described as "among the first Westerners who devoted their life to the practice as well as the spreading of Buddhism" and also as a "prolific writer, translator, and practitioner of Buddhism". As a Westerner seeking to use Western concepts to communicate Buddhism, he has been compared to Teilhard de Chardin, termed "the founding father of Western Buddhism," and noted as "a skilled innovator in his efforts to translate Buddhism to the West."

For Sangharakshita, as with other Buddhists, the factor that unites all Buddhist schools is not any particular teaching but the act of "going for refuge" (sarana-gamana), which he regards "not simply as a formula but as a life-changing event" and as an ongoing "reorientation of one's life away from mundane concerns to the values embodied in the Buddha, Dharma, and Sangha." Any decisive act upon the spiritual path—renunciation, ordination, initiation, the attainment of Stream Entry, and the arising of the bodhicitta—are manifestations or examples of Going for Refuge.

Buddhist teachers are traditionally authorised through a lineage traced back to the Buddha. Although Sangharakshita studied under various eminent Buddhist teachers during his two decades in India, author James William Coleman has said that "he never worked closely enough with any teacher to be recognized as a dharma-heir".

Sangharakshita has acknowledged that “Triratna sometimes bears the mark not of the dharma but of my own particular personality”. Among his distinctive views is his use of the scientific theory of evolution as a metaphor for spiritual development, referring to biological evolution as the "lower evolution" and spiritual growth as being a form of self-directed "higher evolution". Sangharakshita has also drawn parallels between Buddhism and the spirit of the Romantics, who believed that what art reveals has great moral and spiritual significance, and has written of "the religion of art."

Sangharakshita has sometimes been criticised for his views on sex and gender. Though he considers women and men equally capable of Enlightenment and ordained them equally right from the start, he has also said he had "tentatively reached the conclusion that the spiritual life is more difficult for women because they are less able than men to envisage...something purely transcendental..."

Sangharakshita and the FWBO were known for questioning traditional family structures, including encouraging members to join same-sex communities. Sangharakshita also criticised heterosexual nuclear relationships for causing neuroticism and being overly restrictive. The FWBO has been accused of encouraging heterosexual men to engage in sexual relationships with other men in the 1970s and 1980s, in order to get over their fear of intimacy with their male peers and obtain spiritual growth. The organisation has sometimes been described as a cult.

Including compilations of his talks, Sangharakshita has authored more than 60 books. Meanwhile, the Triratna Buddhist Community, which he founded as the FWBO, has been described as "perhaps the most successful attempt to create an ecumenical international Buddhist organization". The community is one of the three largest Buddhist movements in Britain, and has a presence in Europe, the Americas, Asia, and Africa. More than a fifth of all Order members, as of 2006, were in India, where Dr. Ambedkar's mission to convert Dalits to Buddhism continues. Martin Baumann, a scholar of Buddhism, has estimated that there are 100,000 people worldwide who are affiliated with the Triratna Buddhist Community.

For Buddhologist Francis Brassard, Sangharakshita's major contribution is "without doubt his attempt to translate the ideas and practices of [Buddhism] into Western languages." The non-denominational nature of the Triratna Buddhist Community, its equal ordination for both men and women, and its evolution of new forms of shared practice, such as what it calls "team-based right livelihood projects", have been cited as examples of such translation, and also as the creation of a "Buddhist society in miniature within the Western, industrialized world". For Martin Baumann, the Triratna Buddhist Community serves as proof that "Western concepts, such as a capitalistic work ethos, ecological considerations, and a social-reformist perspective, can be integrated into the Buddhist tradition".

== Bibliography ==
=== Biography ===
- Anagarika Dharmapala: A Biographical Sketch
- Great Buddhists of the Twentieth Century

=== Books on Buddhism ===
- The Eternal Legacy: An Introduction to the Canonical Literature of Buddhism
- A Survey of Buddhism: Its Doctrines and Methods Through the Ages
- The Ten Pillars of Buddhism
- The Three Jewels: The Central Ideals of Buddhism

=== Edited seminars and lectures on Buddhism ===
- The Bodhisattva Ideal
- Buddha Mind
- The Buddha's Victory
- Buddhism for Today – and Tomorrow
- Creative Symbols of Tantric Buddhism
- The Drama of Cosmic Enlightenment
- The Essence of Zen
- A Guide to the Buddhist Path
- Human Enlightenment
- The Inconceivable Emancipation
- Know Your Mind
- Living with Awareness
- Living with Kindness
- The Meaning of Conversion in Buddhism
- New Currents in Western Buddhism
- Ritual and Devotion in Buddhism
- The Taste of Freedom
- The Yogi's Joy: Songs of Milarepa
- Tibetan Buddhism: An Introduction
- Transforming Self and World
- Vision and Transformation (also known as The Buddha’s Noble Eightfold Path)
- Who Is the Buddha?
- What Is the Dharma?
- What Is the Sangha?
- Wisdom Beyond Words

=== Essays and papers ===
- Alternative Traditions
- Crossing the Stream
- Going For Refuge
- The Priceless Jewel
- Aspects of Buddhist Morality
- Dialogue between Buddhism and Christianity
- The Journey to Il Covento
- St Jerome Revisited
- Buddhism and Blasphemy
- Buddhism, World Peace, and Nuclear War
- The Bodhisattva Principle
- The Glory of the Literary World
- A Note on The Burial of Count Orgaz
- Criticism East and West
- Dharmapala: The Spiritual Dimension
- With Allen Ginsburg in Kalimpong (1962)
- Indian Buddhists
- Ambedkar and Buddhism

=== Memoirs, autobiography and letters ===
- Facing Mount Kanchenjunga: An English Buddhist in the Eastern Himalayas
- From Genesis to the Diamond Sutra: A Western Buddhist's Encounters with Christianity
- In the Sign of the Golden Wheel: Indian Memoirs of an English Buddhist
- Moving Against the Stream: The Birth of a New Buddhist Movement
- The Rainbow Road: From Tooting Broadway to Kalimpong
- The History of My Going for Refuge
- Precious Teachers
- Travel Letters
- Through Buddhist Eyes

=== Poetry and art ===
- The Call of the Forest and Other Poems
- Complete Poems 1941–1994
- Conquering New Worlds: Selected Poems
- Hercules and the Birds
- In the Realm of the Lotus
- The Religion of Art

=== Polemic ===
- Forty Three Years Ago: Reflections on My Bhikkhu Ordination
- The FWBO and 'Protestant Buddhism': An Affirmation and a Protest
- The Meaning of Orthodoxy in Buddhism
- Was the Buddha a Bhikkhu? A Rejoinder to a Reply to 'Forty Three Years Ago'.

=== Translation ===
- The Dhammapada

== See also ==
- Dharmachari Subhuti – Senior associate of Sangharakshita
