= Nalanda Girls' College =

Nalanda Girls' Central College, Minuwangoda
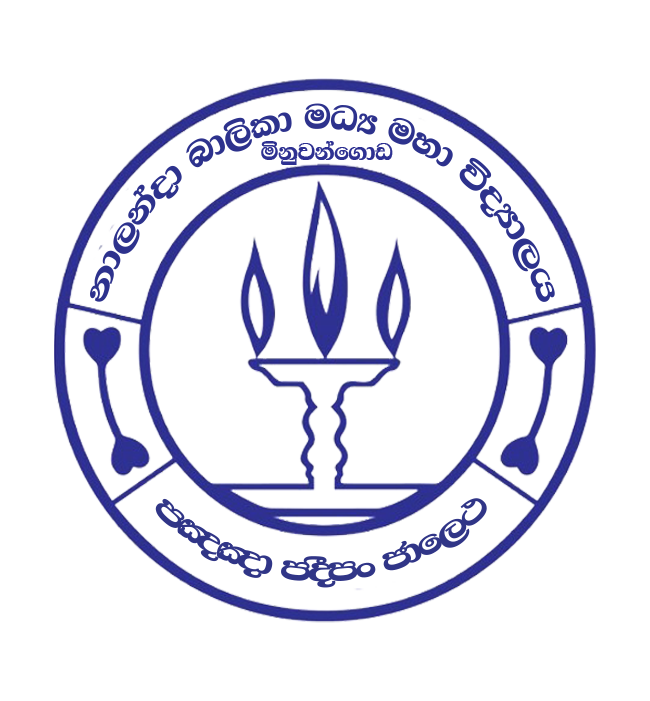
- Nalanda Girls' College logo
- Nalanda (Girls') Central College, Kurunegala Rd, Minuwangoda; Minuwangoda

Information
- Former names: Nalanda Vidyalaya 1942-1962 Nalanda Maha Vidyalaya 1962-1971
- Type: Government
- Motto: පඤඤා පදීපං ජා⁣ලෙථ
- Established: May 5, 1942
- Founders: Venerable Heenatiyana Dhammaloka Thero; J. N. Jinendradasa; Venerable Nilpanagoda Dhammananda Nayaka Thero
- Principal: Dilini Buddhika Rupasinha
- Grades: 1-13
- Gender: Girls
- Colors: Navy blue and White
- Song: සැරදේවා නාලන්දා මේ බාල අපේ මතු ජීවිත සදනා ..

Nalanda Girls' Central College, Minuwangoda (Sinhala: මිනුවන්ගොඩ නාලන්දා බාලිකා මධ්‍ය මහා විද්‍යාලය; Nalanda Balika Madhya Maha Vidyalaya) is a government girls' school in Minuwangoda, Sri Lanka. The school's motto is "පඤඤා පදීපං ජා⁣ලෙථ." Currently, the school offers classes from Grade 1 to Grade 13, catering to over 2500 students, supported by a dedicated teaching staff of 89.

== History ==
Nalanda Girls' Central College, Minuwangoda was established as a branch of Nalanda College, Colombo, on 5 May 1942.

=== Past principals ===
Name	Period
J. N. Jinendradasa	1942-1946
D. J. Walpola	1947-1950
H. Samarawickrama	16.10.1950 - 31.05.1961
J. M. P. Jayasekara	01.06.1961- 25.06.1963
K. T. De Silva	26.06.1963 -17.10.1963
L. S. Jayathilaka	18.10.1963 - 16.05.1966
R. A. Jinasena	17.05.1966 - 01.09.1966
Nimal Vithanachchi	01.09.1966 – 06.03.1972
Swarnalatha Illangakoon	1972 - 28.02.1976
H. M. Sirisuriya	1976 - 1988
Wimala Ranasinghe	1990
E. A. Jayasinghe	1991-1993
M. K. Abeywardena	1993-1999
Lalitha Ranasinghe	
S. M. Ranaweera	
Dilini Buddhika Rupasinha	.01.01.2020 - Present

== See also ==
- Nalanda Boys' Central College
