= Karuna Trust (UK) =

Karuna Trust (UK), also known simply as Karuna, is a charitable organization based in London. They work alongside excluded communities in South Asia to overcome poverty and discrimination through gender equality, education and sustainable livelihood projects.

== History ==
Karuna was founded in 1980 by a small group of Buddhists from the UK, originally under the name "Aid for India".

Since then, the trust has expanded to over 40 projects in India, Nepal and Bangladesh, working with people and organisations who identify as Christian Dalit, Muslim Dalit, Buddhist, Hindu, Tribal or prefer to have no designation at all. It has also generated two sister charities, one in the U.S. and one in Germany.

Dame Judi Dench and Sir David Spiegelhalter are the patrons of the Karuna Trust.
