= Nava Nalanda Mahavihara =

Deemed university in Bihar

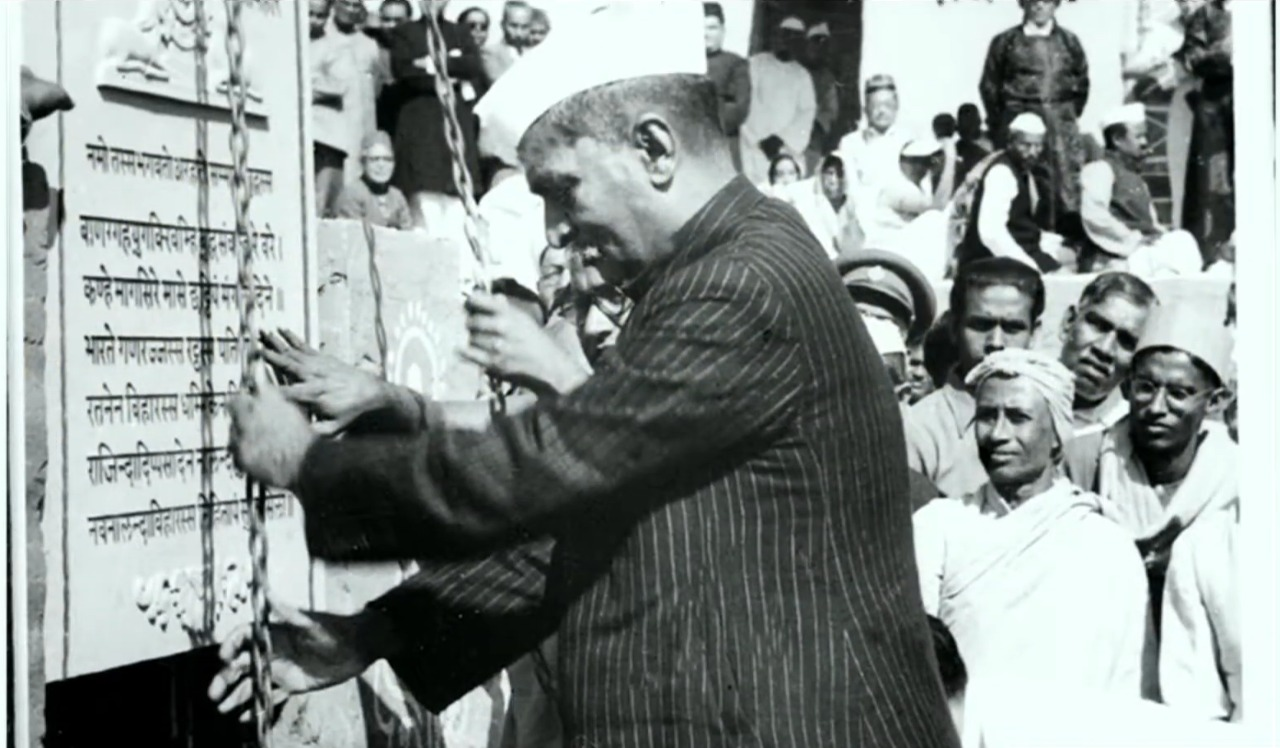
- Dr. Rajendra Prasad at the school's inauguration
- Type: Public, Deemed university
- Established: 1951; 75 years ago
- Chancellor: Union Minister of Culture
- Vice-Chancellor: Siddharth Singh
- Location: Nalanda, Bihar, India; 25.1282408°N 85.4455249°E
- Website: nnm.ac.in

Nava Nalanda Mahavihara (NNM) is an institute deemed to be a university located in Nalanda, Bihar, India. It was established in 1951 under Rajendra Prasad to revive the ancient seat of learning in Nalanda.

== History ==
Nava Nalanda Mahavihara was founded to develop as a centre of higher studies in Pali and Buddhism along the lines of ancient Nalanda Mahavihara. From the beginning, the Institute functioned as a residential institution with few Indian and foreign students. It became a deemed university in 2006.

== Academics ==
NNM offers degrees, certificates, diplomas and research courses in the discipline of Pali, philosophy, ancient history, culture and archaeology, Tibetan studies, Hindi, Sanskrit and more. Renowned Hindi-Bhojpuri-Maithili writer and cultural thinker Parichay Das (Prof. Ravindra Nath Srivastava) is a faculty here.

== Campus ==
The present campus of the Mahavihara is some 100 km from the metropolis of Patna, situated on the southern bank of the historical lake Indrapuskarani. The ruins of the ancient University of Nalanda lie close to the northern bank.

During India's first Global Buddhist Conference in 2021, the Dalai Lama inaugurated two new buildings at the University.
