= Gamini Jayasuriya =

Sri Lankan politician (1924–1998)

Hon. Gamani Nanda Jayasuriya

Member of Parliament for Homagama
- In office March 1960 – 1970
- Preceded by: seat created
- Succeeded by: Wilfred Senanayake
- In office 1977 – 10 November 1987
- Preceded by: Wilfred Senanayake
- Succeeded by: seat abolished

Personal details
- Born: 30 April 1924 Meegoda
- Died: 26 April 1998 (aged 73) Colombo
- Party: United National Party
- Children: Prasanna, Ananda, Devika
- Education: Royal College, Colombo
- Occupation: Politics

Gamani Nanda Jayasuriya (30 April 1924 – 26 April 1998) was a Sri Lankan politician, cabinet minister, and long-serving Member of Parliament for Homagama. He held the portfolios of Minister of Health and Minister of Agriculture Development, Food and Co-operatives, and served as General Secretary of the United National Party (UNP).

He was also chairman of the family-owned furniture firm H. Don Carolis and Sons.

== Early life and family ==
Gamani Jayasuriya was born on 30 April 1924 in Meegoda, Colombo District.

He was the son of Bernard Jayasuriya, a State Councillor, and Sumanadevi Hewavitarne daughter of Edmund Hewavitarne and granddaughter of Don Carolis Hewavitharana.

He belonged to the Hewavitarne family, which included figures such as Anagarika Dharmapala, Raja Hewavitarne, Neil Hewavitarne and multiple political leaders of the colonial and post-independence eras.

Jayasuriya was educated at Royal College, Colombo.

He married Sita Hewavitarne, daughter of Neil Hewavitarne, a former chairman of H. Don Carolis and Sons. Through this marriage he linked two branches of the Hewavitarne family. They had three children: Ananda, Prasanna and Devika.

== Business career ==
Jayasuriya inherited leadership responsibilities within the family’s historic firm, H. Don Carolis and Sons, founded in 1860 by his great-grandfather Don Carolis Hewavitarne.

He succeeded his uncle Raja Hewavitarne, becoming the first fourth-generation family member to chair the company.

Under his leadership, Don Carolis expanded its reputation as one of Sri Lanka’s largest and oldest furniture manufacturers, supplying homes, hotels, government buildings and export clients.

The Jayasuriya family also contributed significantly to the development of Meegoda. His grandfather D.C.D Jayasuriya who was a landed proprietor and owner of the Siri Medura Estate of Homagama donated local schools and public institutions. Today the main school in the area is named Gamini Jayasuriya Maha Vidyalaya in his honour.

== Political career ==
=== Entry into politics ===
Jayasuriya entered politics through the United National Party. He was elected MP for Homagama in March 1960, holding the seat until 1970, and again from 1977 to 1987.

He also served as General Secretary of the UNP, playing a major organisational role.

=== Cabinet minister ===
Jayasuriya served as:

- Minister of Health, and - Minister of Agriculture Development, Food and Co-operatives.

His responsibilities included agricultural pricing, co-operative reform, food distribution, and the national health system.

=== Opposition to the Indo–Sri Lanka Accord ===
Jayasuriya is widely remembered for his principled opposition to the 1987 Indo–Sri Lanka Accord. Immediately after the signing of the agreement by President J. R. Jayewardene and Indian PM Rajiv Gandhi, he resigned from the Cabinet and from party leadership.

He argued that the agreement and the presence of the Indian Peace Keeping Force (IPKF) threatened Sri Lanka’s sovereignty.

=== Parliamentary work ===
Across his parliamentary career (1960–1970, 1977–1987), he was known for:

rural development in Homagama and Meegoda, improvements to schools and hospitals, and involvement in agricultural and health policy debates.

He participated in legislative transitions from the 1972 Constitution to the 1978 Constitution, which introduced the executive presidency and proportional representation.

== Later life and death ==
After resigning from Cabinet, Jayasuriya remained active in family business leadership serving as a trustee of the Anagarika Dharmapala Trust until 1995, and regional philanthropy.

He died on 26 April 1998 in Colombo. Obituaries praised his long public service and his contributions to both national politics and the Hewavitarne–Jayasuriya family enterprises.

== Legacy ==
Jayasuriya’s legacy spans politics, business, and regional development.

He was a cabinet minister and a member of the UNP who left the government following the Indo–Sri Lanka Accord.

Regionally, schools and institutions in Meegoda reflect the Jayasuriya family’s contributions, particularly the naming of Gamini Jayasuriya Maha Vidyalaya.

In business, he helped continue the Hewavitarne tradition of family entrepreneurship by leading Don Carolis into its fourth generation.

== See also ==
- H. Don Carolis and Sons
- Hewavitarne family
- List of political families in Sri Lanka
