= Susil Moonesinghe =

Sri Lankan politician

Hon. Susil Moonesinghe

Personal details
- Born: 11 February 1930 Colombo, Sri Lanka
- Died: 30 November 2012 (aged 82) Kandy, Sri Lanka
- Party: United National Party
- Other political affiliations: Mahajana Eksath Peramuna, Sri Lanka Freedom Party
- Education: Royal College, Colombo
- Occupation: Politics, diplomat
- Profession: Barrister

Susil Moonesinghe (11 February 1930 – 30 November 2012) was a Sri Lankan lawyer, politician, diplomat and former chairman of State Trading Wholesale Company Ltd. A former chief minister of the Western Provincial Council and a member of parliament, he was Sri Lankan Ambassador to Iran. The brother of Anil Moonesinghe and the son of Piyadas Moonesinghe, he was educated at the Royal College, Colombo.

His paternal grandmother was the sister of Anagarika Dharmapala, daughter of Don Carolis Hewavitharana and granddaughter of Andiris Perera Dharmagunawardhana.

He began his political career by contesting, unsuccessfully, the Polgahawela constituency in the 1960 general election from the Mahajana Eksath Peramuna. During the 1970 general election, he was appointed organiser for the Southern Province by the Sri Lanka Freedom Party.

From 1970 to 1972, he was director-general of Sri Lanka Broadcasting Corporation. Thereafter, he devoted himself to business activities.

He was elected first chief minister of the Western Province in 1988 and served until 1993. Thereafter, until 1994 he was leader of the opposition in the provincial council. In 1994-2000, he was a member of parliament for Colombo District. In 2000-2002, he was Ambassador to Iran.

== See also ==
- List of political families in Sri Lanka
- Sri Lankan Non Career Diplomats
