= H. Don Carolis and Sons =

Sri Lankan furniture manufacturer

H. Don Carolis & Sons (Pvt) Ltd
- Company type: Private company
- Industry: Furniture manufacturing
- Founded: 1860; 166 years ago
- Founder: Don Carolis Hewavitharana
- Headquarters: Colombo, Sri Lanka
- Key people: Viraj Hewavitarne (Chairman) Devika Waidyaratne (Director) Yadesh Waidyaratne (Director)
- Products: Hardwood furniture, interior projects
- Website: www.doncarolis.com

H. Don Carolis & Sons is a Sri Lankan furniture manufacturing company founded in 1860 by Don Carolis Hewavitharana in Pettah, Colombo. It is regarded as one of the oldest continuously operating furniture manufacturers in Sri Lanka.

== History ==
The firm began as a workshop and showroom on Keyzer Street in Pettah, supplying European-style hardwood furniture to plantation owners, civil servants and urban households in colonial Ceylon.

The early twentieth-century reference work 20th Century Impressions of Ceylon described H. Don Carolis & Sons as one of Colombo’s principal furniture manufacturers and noted its extensive premises and range of products. By this time the company had expanded from its original workshop to a larger factory in Slave Island, known as the Colombo Steam Furniture Works, and employed several hundred workers.

According to Robin Jones’ study and later analyses of Ceylonese furniture in international exhibitions, Don Carolis exported furniture to markets including Australia, South Africa, India, Burma, Europe and the United States, and was among the Ceylonese manufacturers whose work was shown at exhibitions in Paris (1900) and St Louis (1904).

The business later passed to Edmund Hewavitarne, son of the founder, and remained under the management of the Hewavitarne family. Other family members associated with the firm included Anagarika Dharmapala (Don David Hewavitarne), Raja Hewavitarne and Neil Hewavitarne. The company is multi-generational family enterprise that has continued into the fifth and sixth generations.

The company maintained a large showroom complex in Pettah until the early 2000s, when manufacturing was consolidated at sites in Moratuwa and Kalutara.

== Operations ==
H. Don Carolis & Sons manufactures hardwood furniture for domestic, commercial and institutional customers. The company’s products include bedroom, living-room and dining-room furniture, office furniture and custom project work for hotels and other large clients. Its main production facilities are located in Moratuwa and Kalutara.

Additionally, sawdust and shavings from the company’s factories are processed into briquettes used as fuel in timber kilns and tea-drying facilities.

== Notable figures ==
Members of the Hewavitarne family connected to the business include:

- Don Carolis Hewavitharana – founder of the company
- Edmund Hewavitarne – proprietor and nationalist figure
- Anagarika Dharmapala – Buddhist revivalist and independence activist, son of Don Carolis
- Neil Hewavitarne – member of the State Council of Ceylon
- Raja Hewavitarne – member of the State Council of Ceylon
- Gamini Jayasuriya – Cabinet minister who served as chairman of the company in the twentieth century

== See also ==
- State Council of Ceylon
