= Charles Alwis Hewavitharana =

Ceylonese (Sinhalese) physician

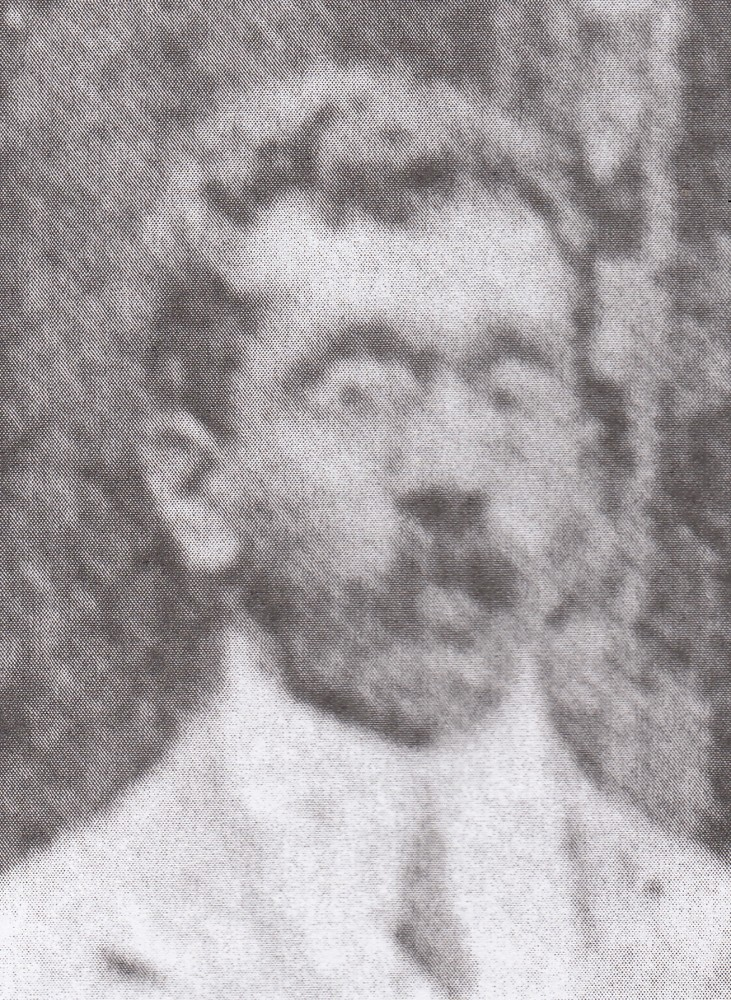
Dr C. A. Hewavitarne.

Charles Alwis Hewavitarne, FRCS, LRCP was a Ceylonese (Sinhalese) physician who played a significant role in Sri Lanka's Independence and Buddhist Revival movements. He was the brother of Anagarika Dharmapala.

== Early life ==
He was born in Colombo, Ceylon, to Don Carolis Hewavitharana and Mallika Dharmagoonewardena the daughter of Lansige Lansige Andiris Perera Dharmagunawardhana, a wealthy businessman. His other siblings were Don David Hewavitarne who later changed his name to Anagarika Dharmapala and became a prominent figure in the Buddhist revival movement in Ceylon and in India; Edmund Hewavitarne; Simon Alexander Hewavitarne, and Dona Engeltina née Moonesinghe.

== Education ==
Charles Hewavitarne was educated at Colombo Academy and at the Ceylon Medical College. After graduating he joined the Ceylon Medical Service left for Britain for further studies gaining a LRCP (London) and FRCS. Although working as a physician he became an active independence activist working with his older brother leaving the Ceylon Medical Service.

== Independence activity ==
He was imprisoned in 1915 along with his brother Edmund Hewavitarne (who later died in prison), D. S. Senanayake, D. R. Wijewardena following the Muslim riots. Fearing an uprising the inexperienced British colonial Governor of Ceylon Sir Robert Chalmers declared Martial Law on 2 June 1915 and on the advice of Inspector General of Police Herbert Dowbiggin began a brutal suppression of the Sinhala Buddhist community by giving orders to the Police and the Army to shoot any one who they deemed a rioter without a trial, it is said that the numbers of Sinhalese killed this way were in the thousands. Many local leaders were imprisoned and Captain D.E.Henry Pedris, a military officer, was executed based on false charges of mutiny.

== Later years ==
Dr. Hewavitarne was a member of the University College Ceylon Council. The Dr. C. A. Hewavitarne Memorial Prizes for Physics & Sanskrit are annually awarded at the University of Colombo in his memory. The Dr. C. A. Hewavitarne Memorial Prize for Physics is also annually awarded by the Faculty of Science, University of Peradeniya.
