= Buddhist flag =

Universal symbol of Buddhism

International Buddhist flag of the World Fellowship of Buddhists

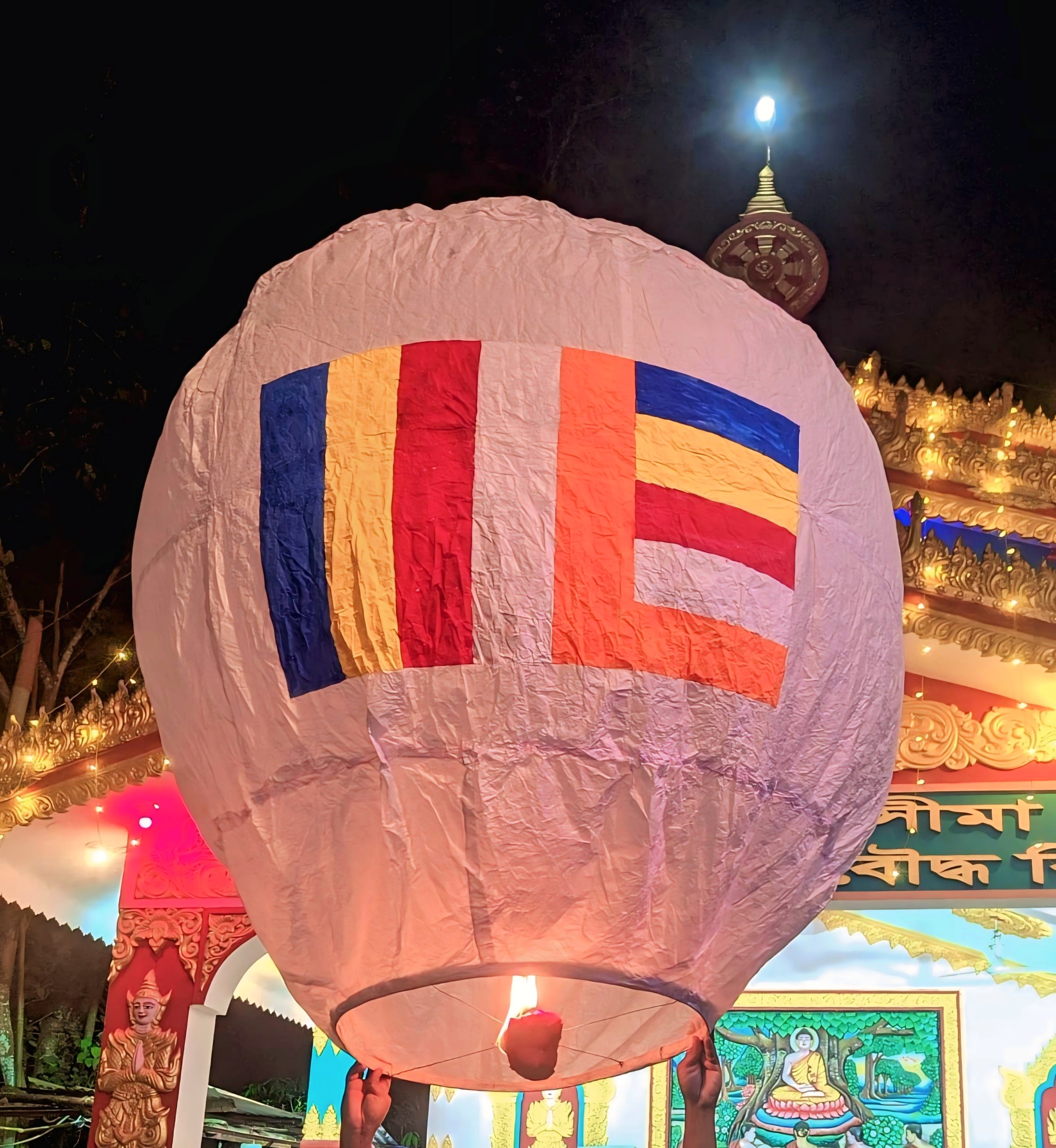
Flag depicted on a sky lantern in Bangladesh

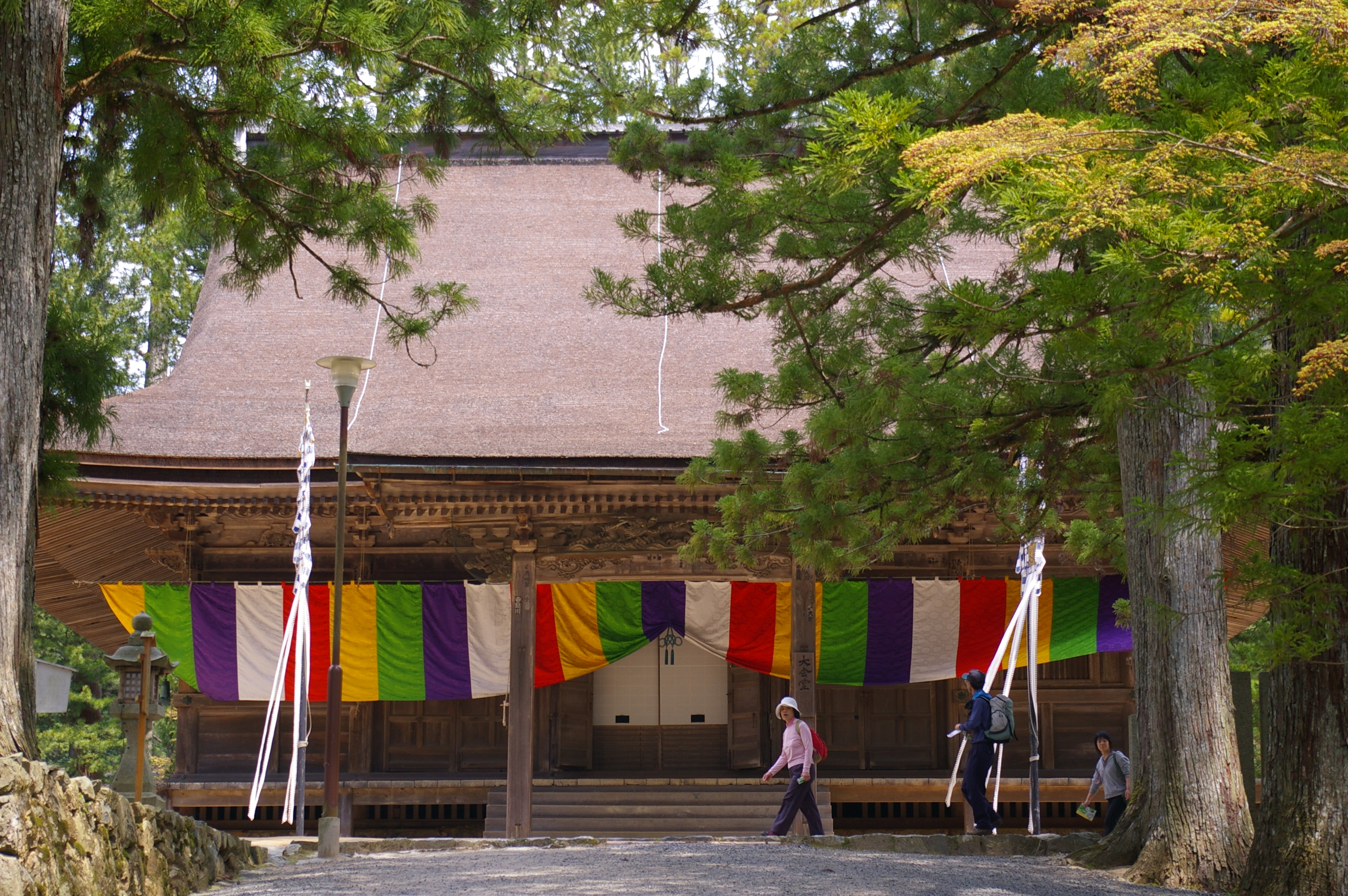
Horizontal goshikimaku flag on Buddhist temple. This variant uses the standard Buddhist flag colors in Japan

There are various Buddhist flags used to represent Buddhism as a whole or specific schools of Buddhism.

One popular flag with six bands of colour was designed in late 19th century Sri Lanka as a universal symbol of Buddhism. This flag became popular throughout South East Asia, and was adopted by the World Fellowship of Buddhists as an official flag. The flag's five vertical bands represent the five colors of the aura which Buddhists believe emanated from the body of the Buddha when he attained enlightenment.

However, alternative versions of this flag and other different Buddhist flags are also flown in other countries, with different Buddhist groups having their own preferences.

There are also various types of Buddhist prayer flags, which serve a different function.

== The International Buddhist Flag ==
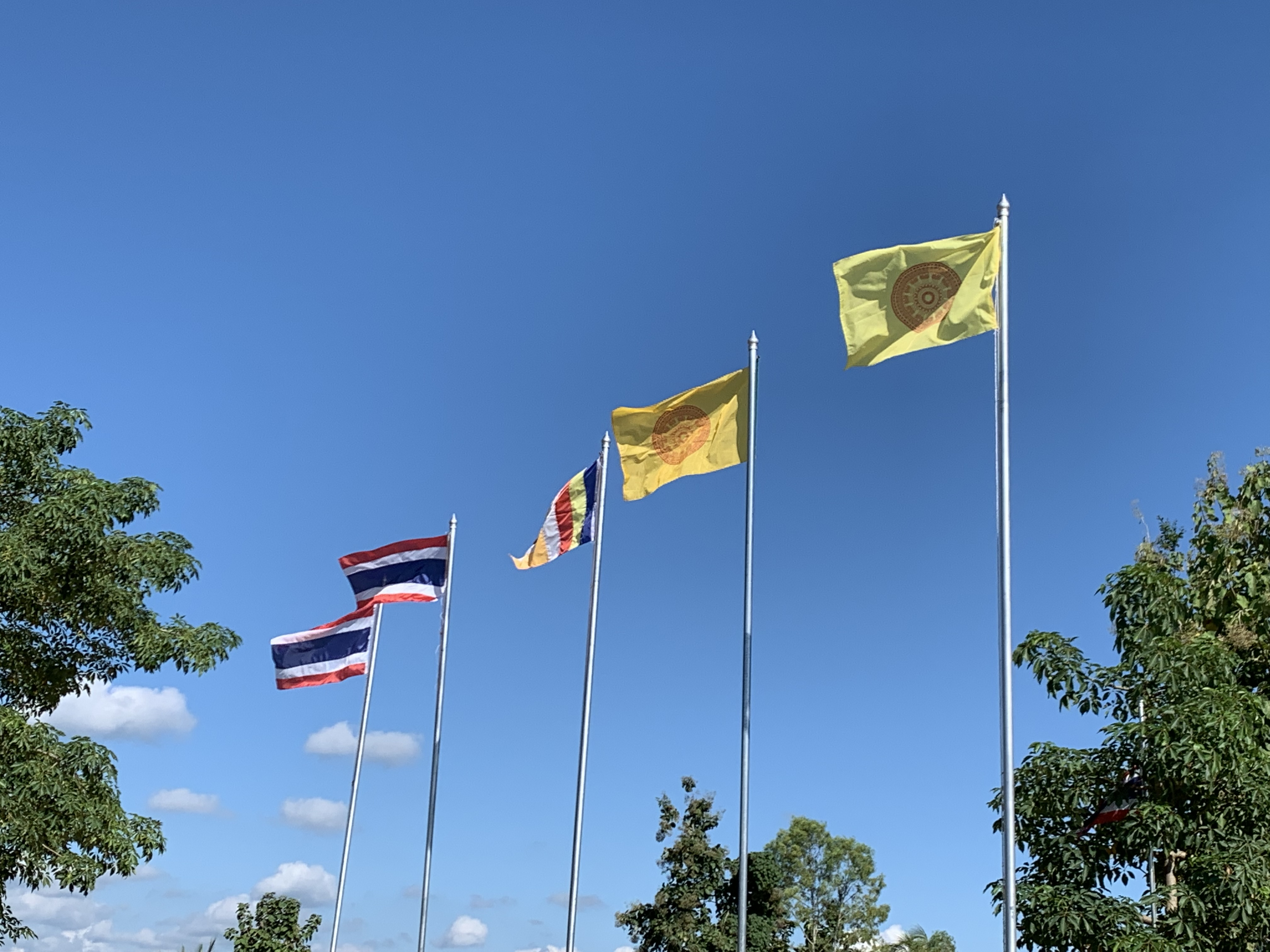
The Buddhist flag alongside Dharmachakra flags (Thai Buddhist flag) and Thai flags in Wat Hiranyawat, Thailand

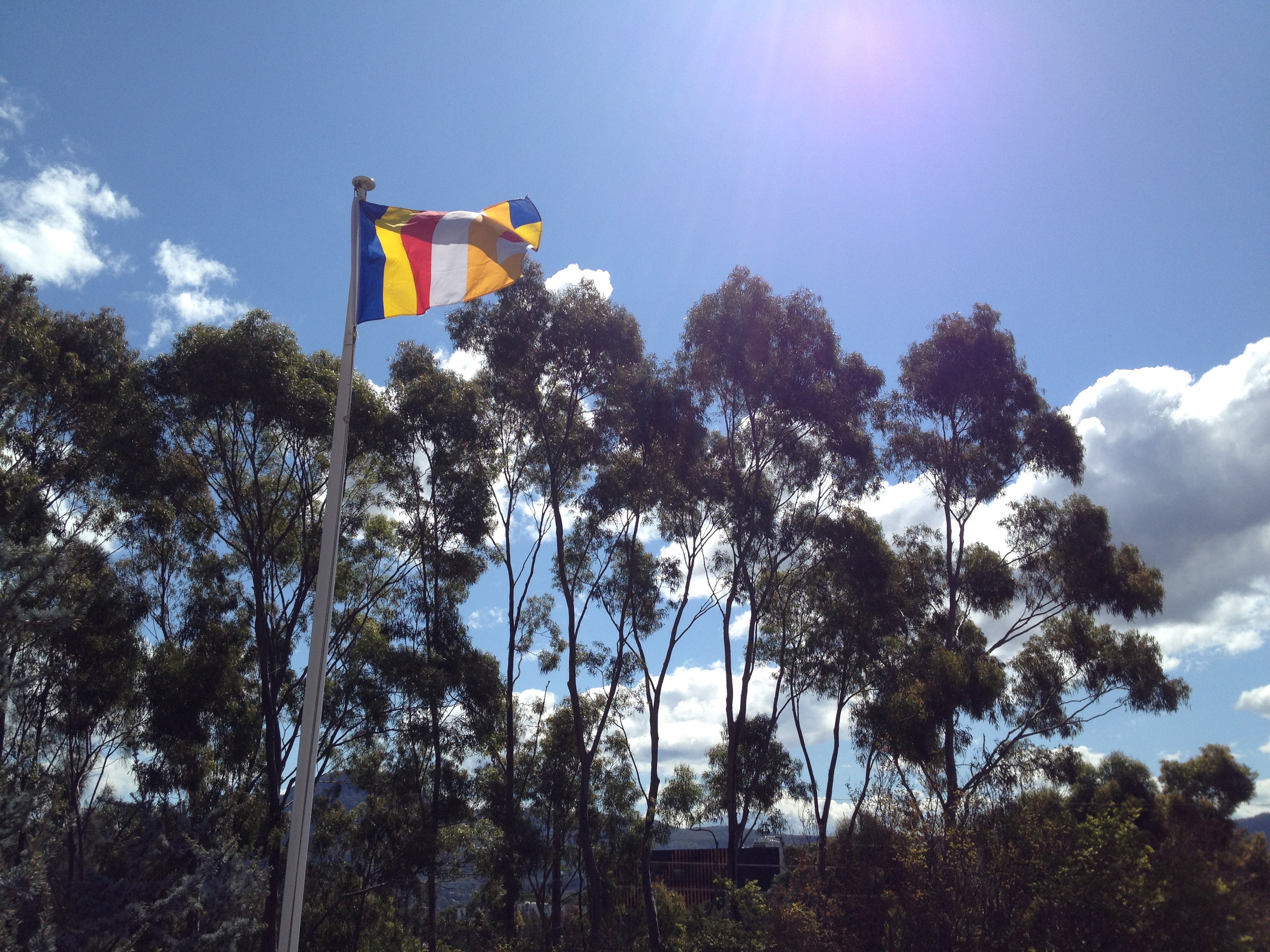
The Buddhist flag flying at the Nan Tien Temple, Wollongong, Australia

The International six stripe Buddhist flag was originally designed in 1885 by the Colombo Committee, in Colombo, Ceylon (now Sri Lanka). The committee consisted of Ven. Hikkaduwe Sri Sumangala Thera (chairman), Ven. Migettuwatte Gunananda Thera, Don Carolis Hewavitharana (father of Anagarika Dharmapala), Andiris Perera Dharmagunawardhana (maternal grandfather of Anagarika Dharmapala), Charles A. de Silva, Peter De Abrew, William De Abrew (father of Peter), H. William Fernando, N. S. Fernando and Carolis Pujitha Gunawardena (secretary).

It was first publicly hoisted on Vesak day, 28 May 1885 at the Dipaduttamarama, Kotahena, by Ven. Migettuwatte Gunananda Thera. This was the first Vesak public holiday under British rule.

Colonel Henry Steel Olcott, an American journalist, founder and first president of the Theosophical Society, felt that its long streaming shape made it inconvenient for general use. He therefore suggested modifying it so that it was the size and shape of national flags.

In 1889, the modified flag was introduced to Japan by Anagarika Dharmapala and Olcott—who presented it to Emperor Meiji—and subsequently to Myanmar.

At the 1950 World Fellowship of Buddhists, the flag of Buddhists was adopted as the International Buddhist Flag.

=== Colours ===
The flag's five vertical bands represent the five colors of the aura which Buddhists believe emanated from the body of the Buddha when he attained Enlightenment:

- Blue (Pāli and Sanskrit: nīla): The Spirit of Universal Compassion
- Yellow (Pāli and Sanskrit: pīta): The Middle Way
- Red (Pāli and Sanskrit: lohitaka): The Blessings of Practice – achievement, wisdom, virtue, fortune and dignity
- White (Pali: odāta; Sanskrit: avadāta): The Purity of Dhamma – leading to liberation, timeless
- Orange (Pali: mañjeṭṭha; Sanskrit: mañjiṣṭhā), alternatively scarlet: The Wisdom of the Buddha's teachings

The sixth vertical band, on the fly, is made up of a combination of the five other colors' rectangular bands, and represents a compound of said colors in the aura's spectrum. This new, compound color is referred to as the Truth of the Buddha's teaching or Pabbhassara (lit. 'essence of light').

=== Variant Six Band flags ===
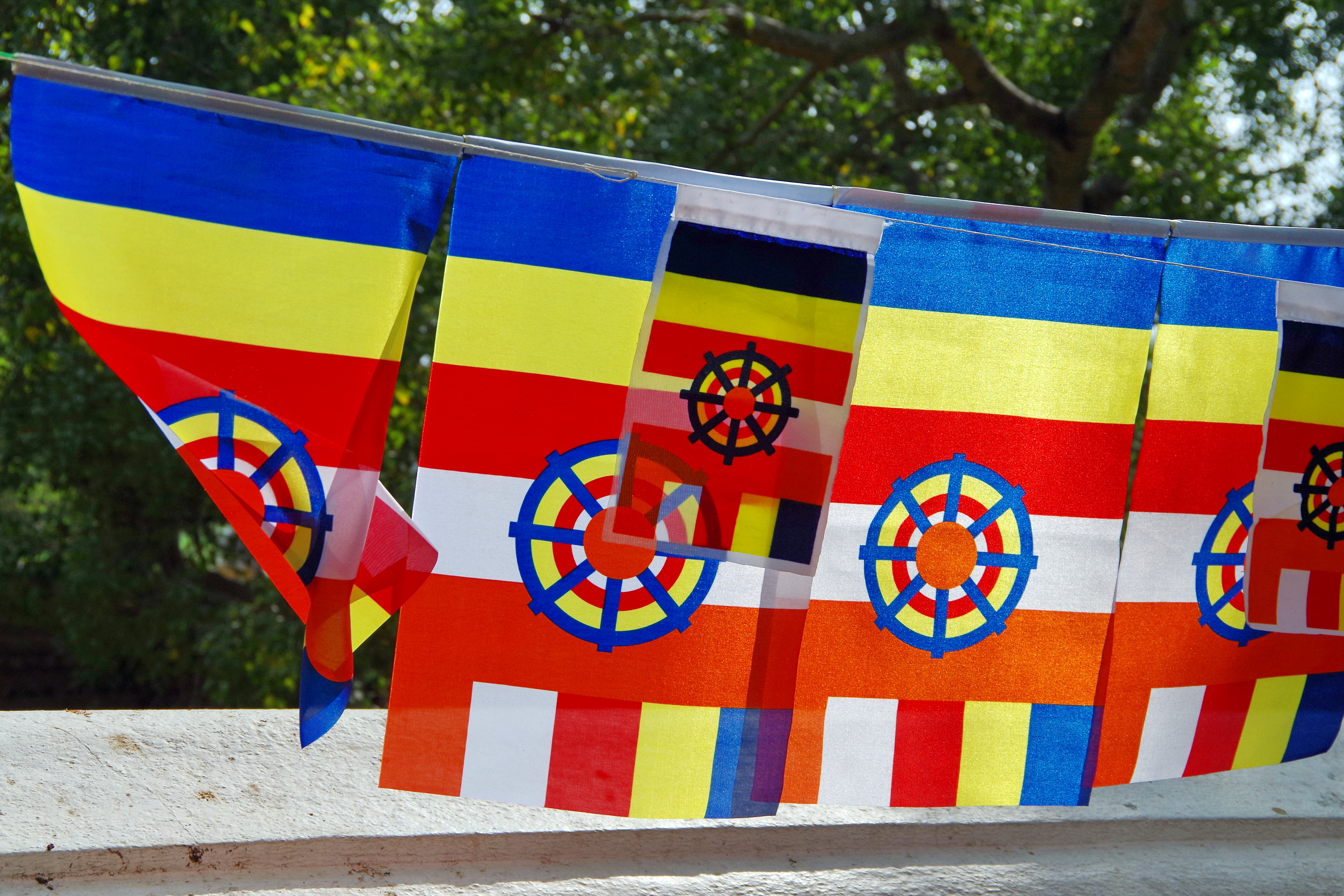
Variant six stripe flag with the Dharma-wheel in front

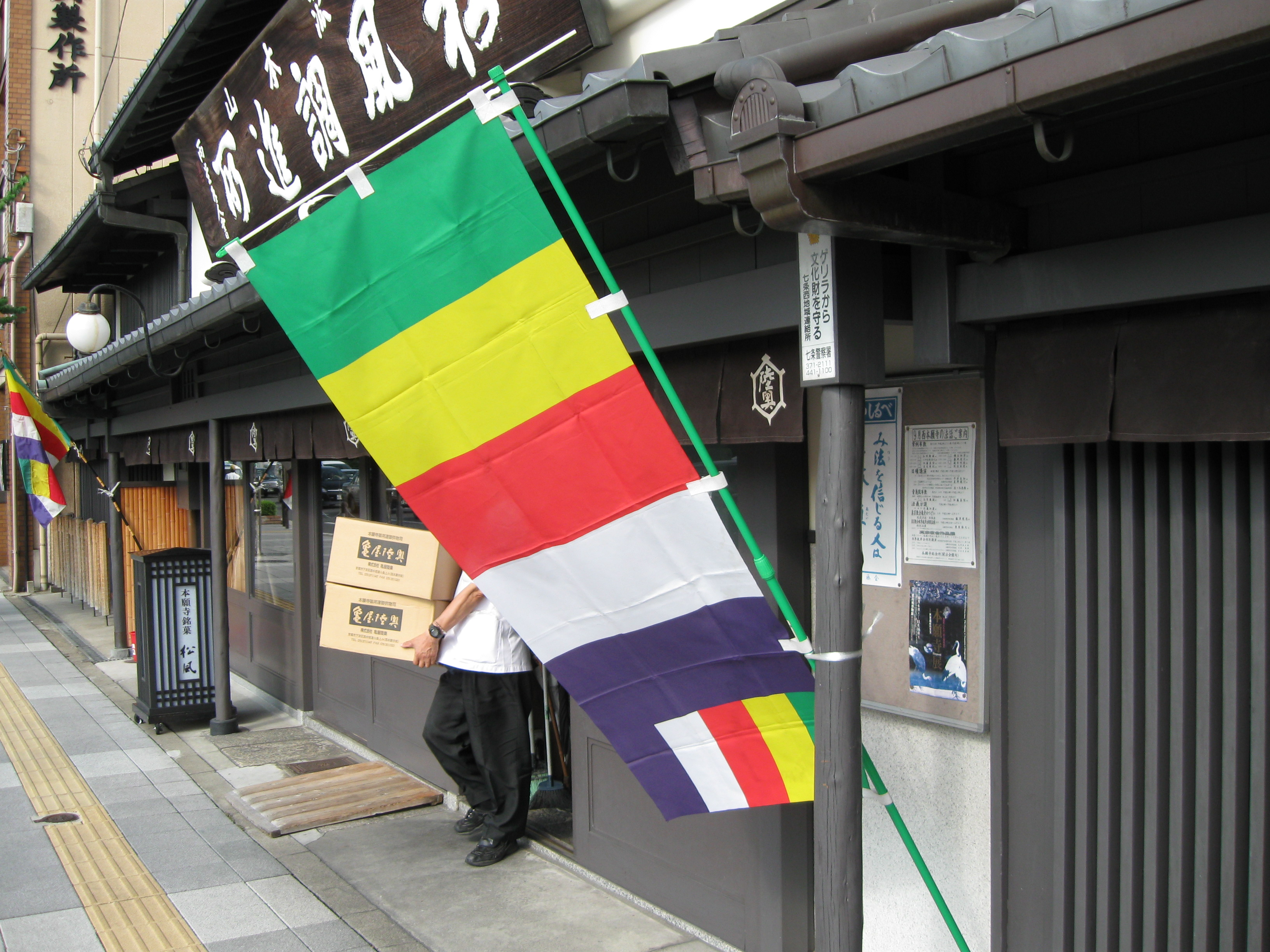
The variant Japanese flag in Kyoto

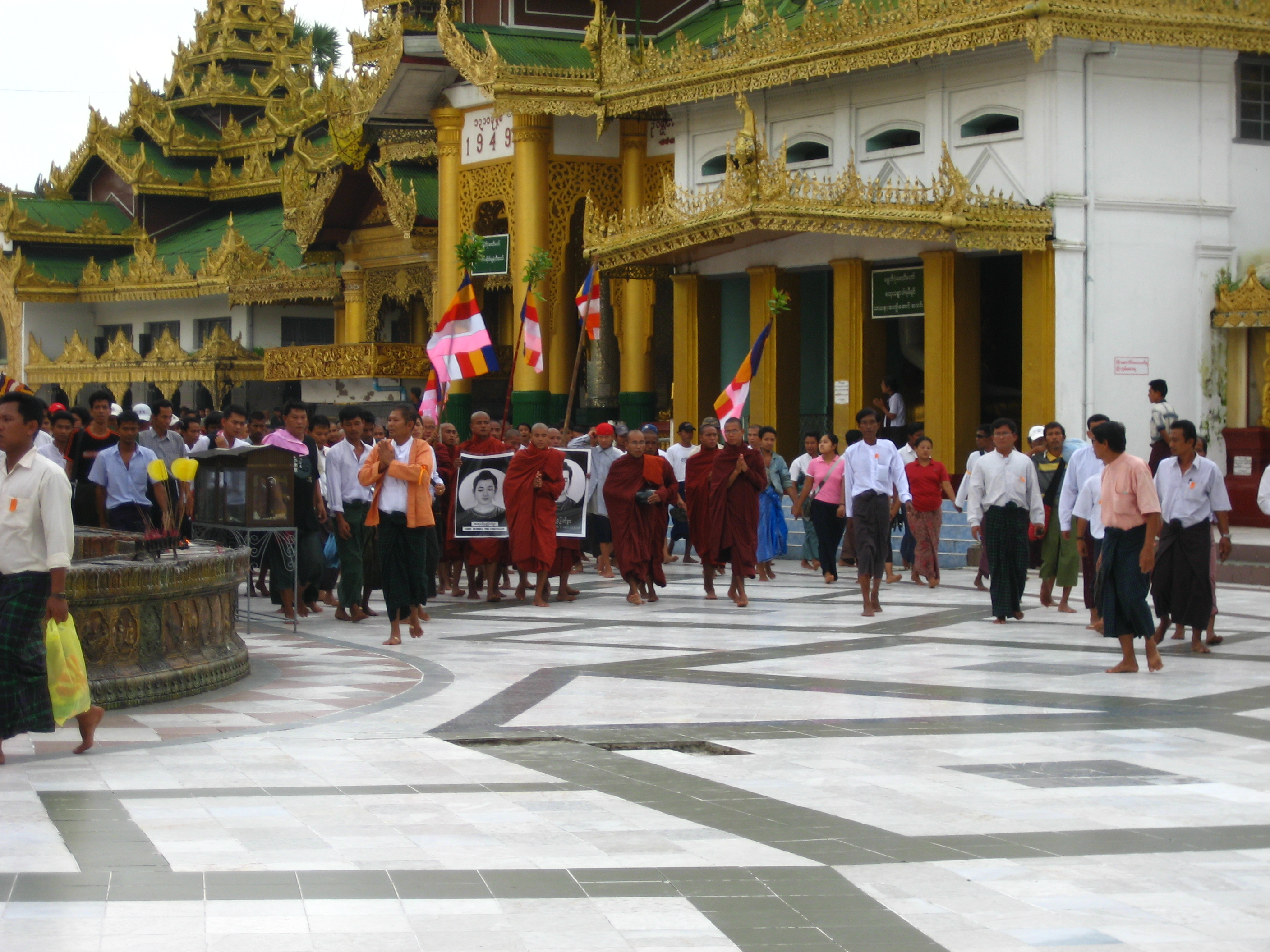
Myanmar variant flying in the 2007 Myanmar protests

There are numerous variations of the six stripe Buddhist flags, most commonly achieved by changing the color of one of the stripes. For example:

- Sometimes, Buddhist symbols are placed in front of the stripes. The common one is the Dharmachakra.
- The colour mañjeṭṭha is interpreted as pink in Myanmar, a Theravāda Buddhist country and Vietnam, a Mahayana Buddhist country.
- In Japan, there is a traditional Buddhist flag (五色幕 — goshikimaku) which has different colors but is sometimes merged with the design of the international flag to represent international cooperation.
- In Tibet, the stripes' colors represent the different colors of Buddhist robes comprehensively united in one banner. Tibetan monastic robes are maroon, so the orange stripes in the original design are often replaced with maroon.
- Tibetan Buddhists in Nepal replace the orange stripes with plum stripes.
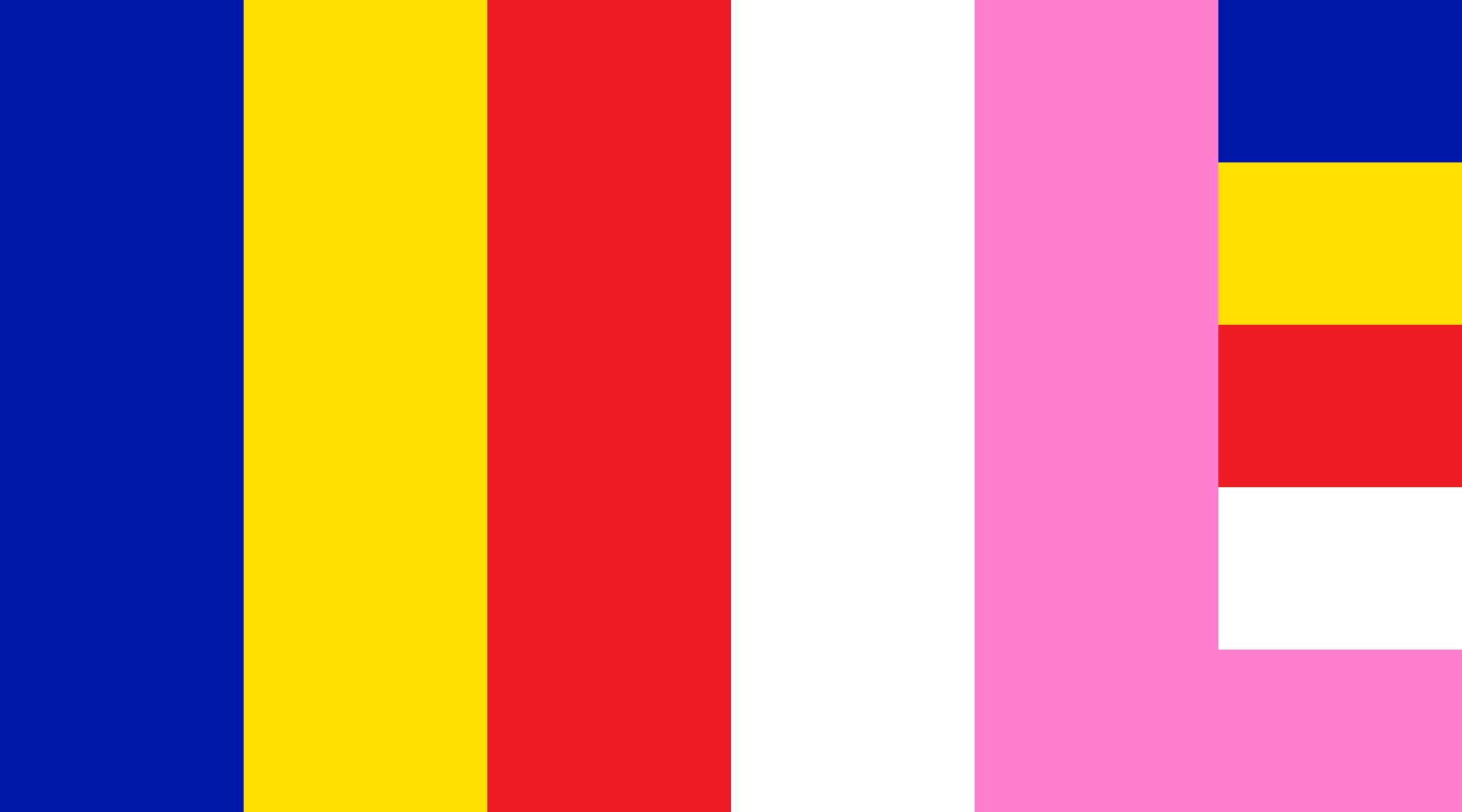
Burmese and Vietnamese Buddhist flag

Tibetan Buddhist flag

Nepalese Buddhist flag

Japanese Buddhist flag (五色幕, goshikimaku)

A common variant with the dharmachakra

Laotian Buddhist flag

== Other Buddhist flags ==
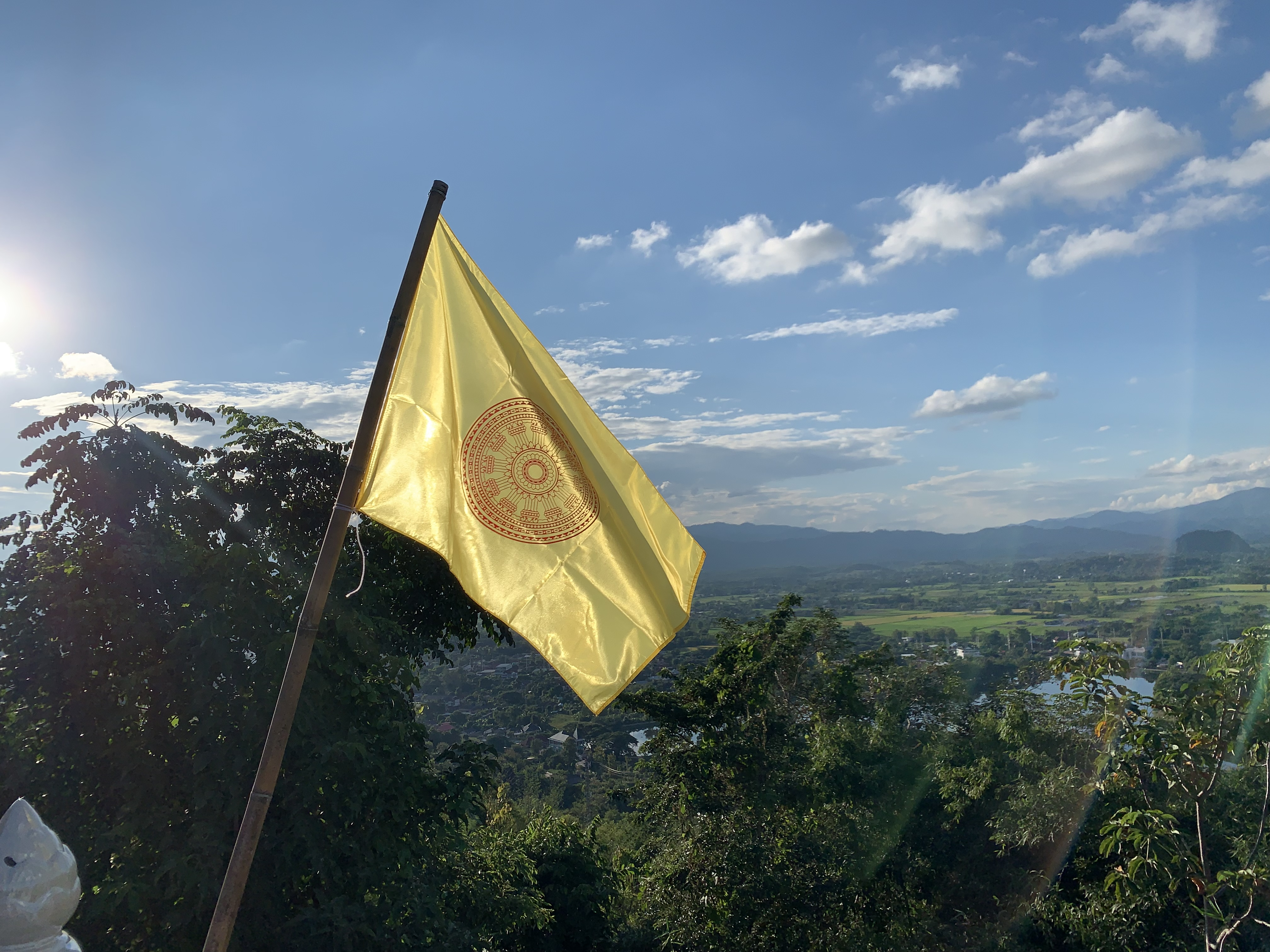
The Dharma-wheel flag, symbol of Buddhism in Thailand

In various Buddhist nations and among different Buddhist groups alternative Buddhist flags may be more popular than the six stripe flag. Some of these flags are meant to represent Buddhism as a whole, while others represent specific Buddhist traditions or organizations.

=== Flags representing Buddhism as a whole ===
One example of alternative universalist Buddhist flags is that used by Theravāda Buddhists in Thailand, who opt for the usage of a yellow flag with a red Dhammacakka (ธงธรรมจักร – thong thammajak). This flag is sometimes flown alongside the international Buddhist flag. It was officially adopted in 1958 by Buddhist monks, and flown outside temples alongside the national flag and on important events.

Thai Buddhist Dharma-wheel flag

Korean Buddhist swastika flag

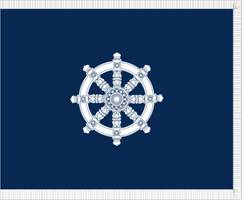
US Army chapel Buddhist flag using an eight spoked Dharma-wheel

A blue Dharma-wheel flag used by the Dalit Buddhist movement which uses the Ashoka Chakra

=== Flags representing specific Buddhist traditions or people ===
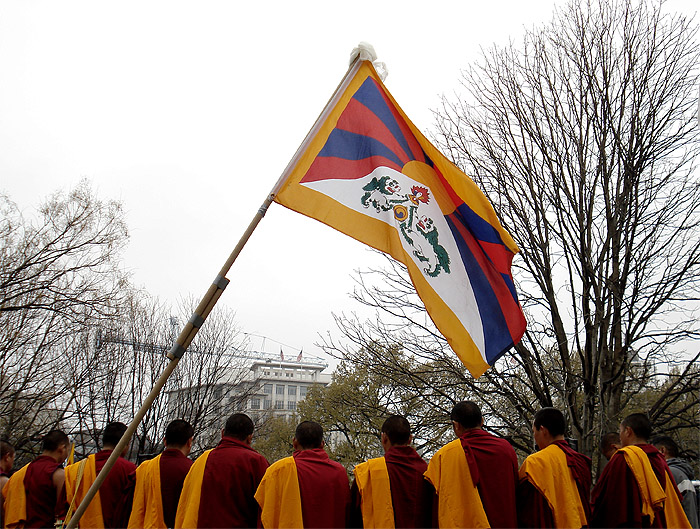
Buddhist monks flying the Flag of Tibet

One example of this is class of Buddhist flags is the flag of Tibet, which is unofficially used to represent Tibetan Buddhism. The flag contains various Buddhist symbols representing the spread of Buddhism.

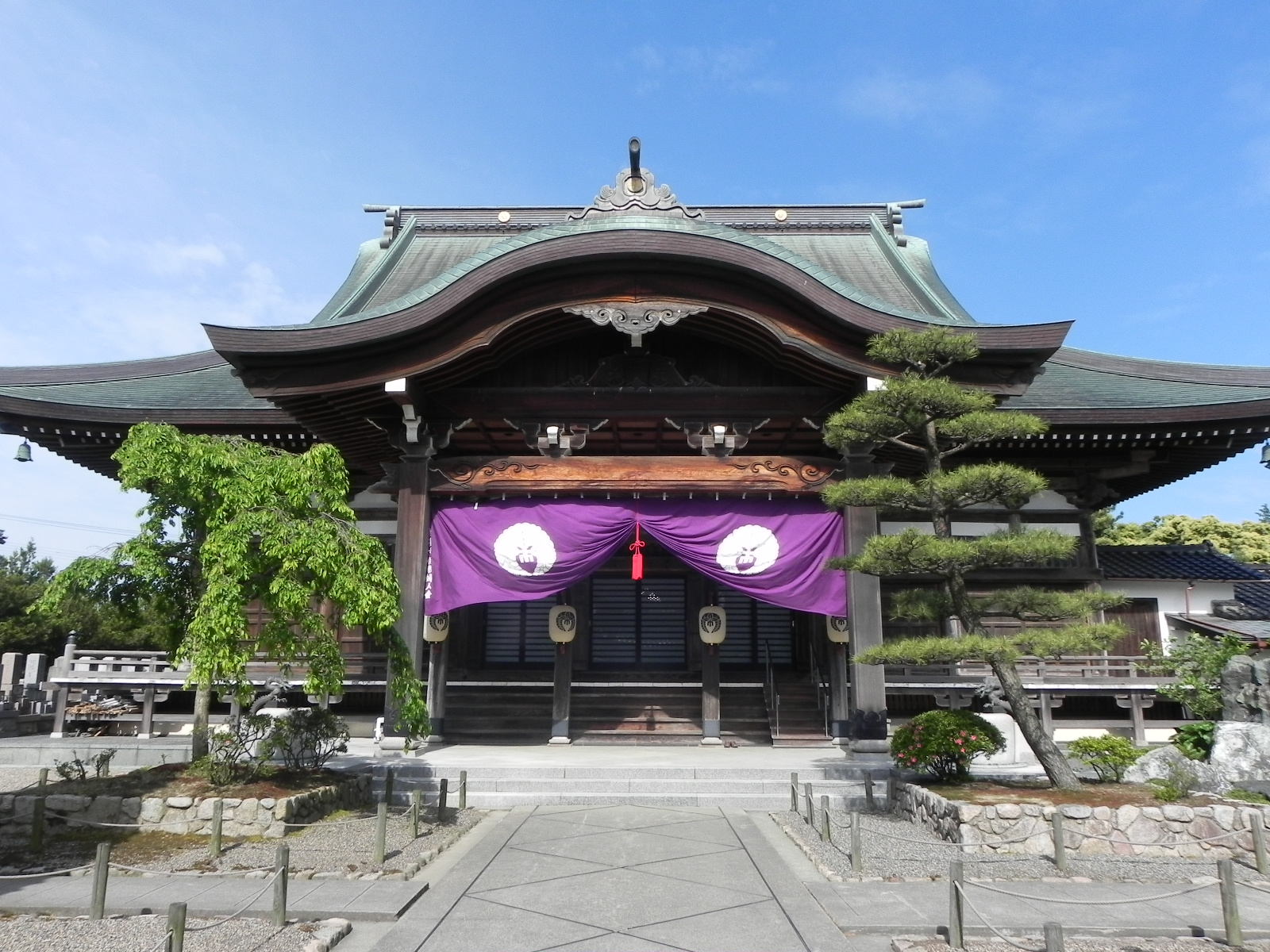
The main hall of a Japanese Buddhist temple with flags depicting the sect emblem (mon) of the Honganji sect of Jōdo Shinshū. The emblem is the Nishi Rokujō Fuji (Western Rokujō Wisteria).

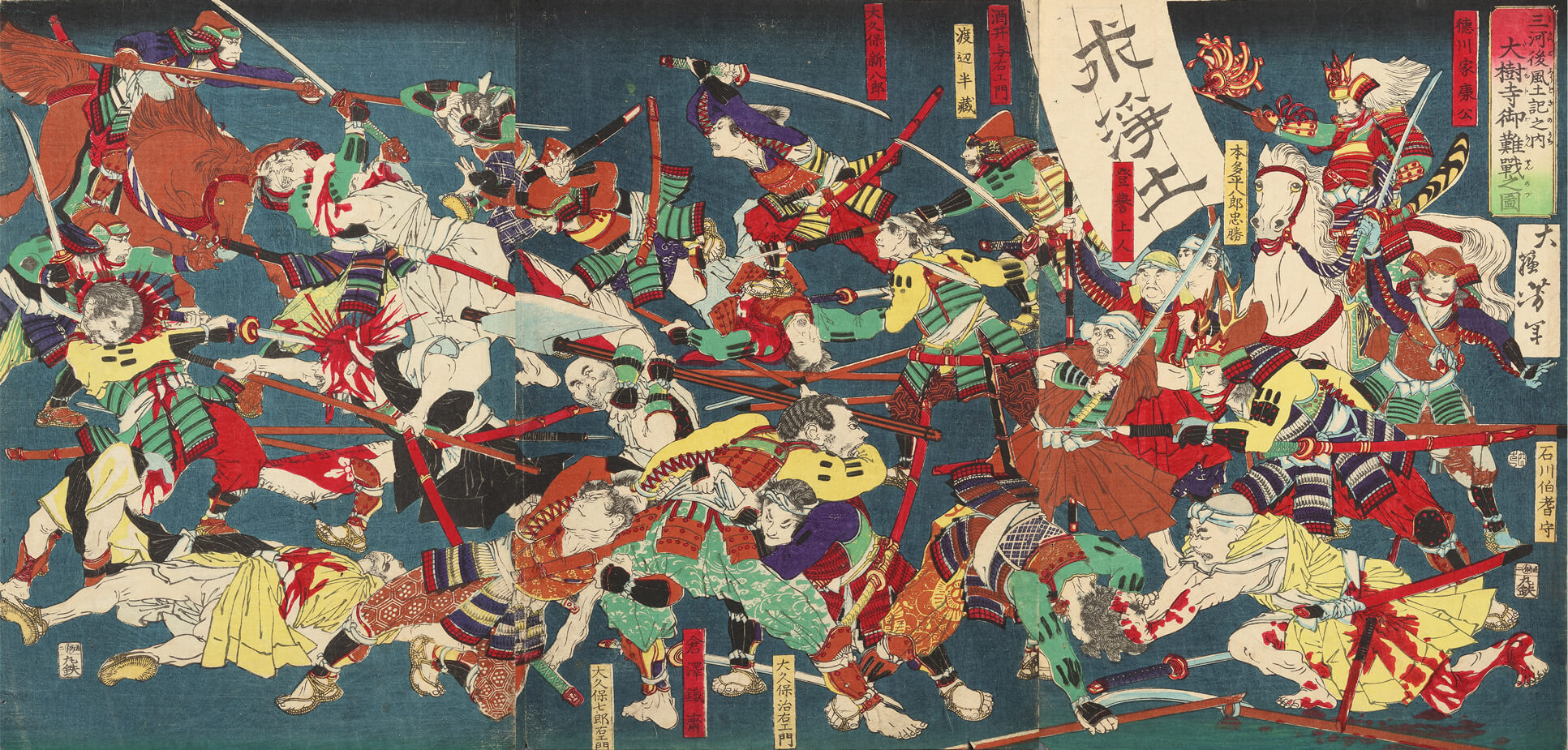
Japanese illustration depicting Tokugawa Ieyasu and Jodo sect monks in combat with the Ikkō-ikki at the Battle of Azukizaka (1564). Some of the men in the illustration carry a white flag with the slogan "Seeking Rebirth in the Pure Land" (欣求浄土).

Japanese Buddhist sects often depict their sect emblems (宗紋) in flags that are often hung on or near Buddhist temples. These sect flags (宗旗) usually contain the crest or emblem of the school (known as mon or monshō 紋章 in Japanese).

The new religion of Soka Gakkai flies a tricolour of blue, yellow, and red. It is often mistaken for the flags of Chad and Romania.

Tibetan Flag

The old flag of Sikkim was purely made up of Buddhist symbols

The Flag of Kalmykia's yellow color symbolizes the people's Buddhist faith, and the white lotus is a common Buddhist symbol

Karma Kagyu flag (Rangjung Rigpe Dorje, 16th Karmapa's "dream flag").

Flag of the Burmese Young Men's Buddhist Association

Flag of Vietnamese Pure Land Buddhist Laity Association

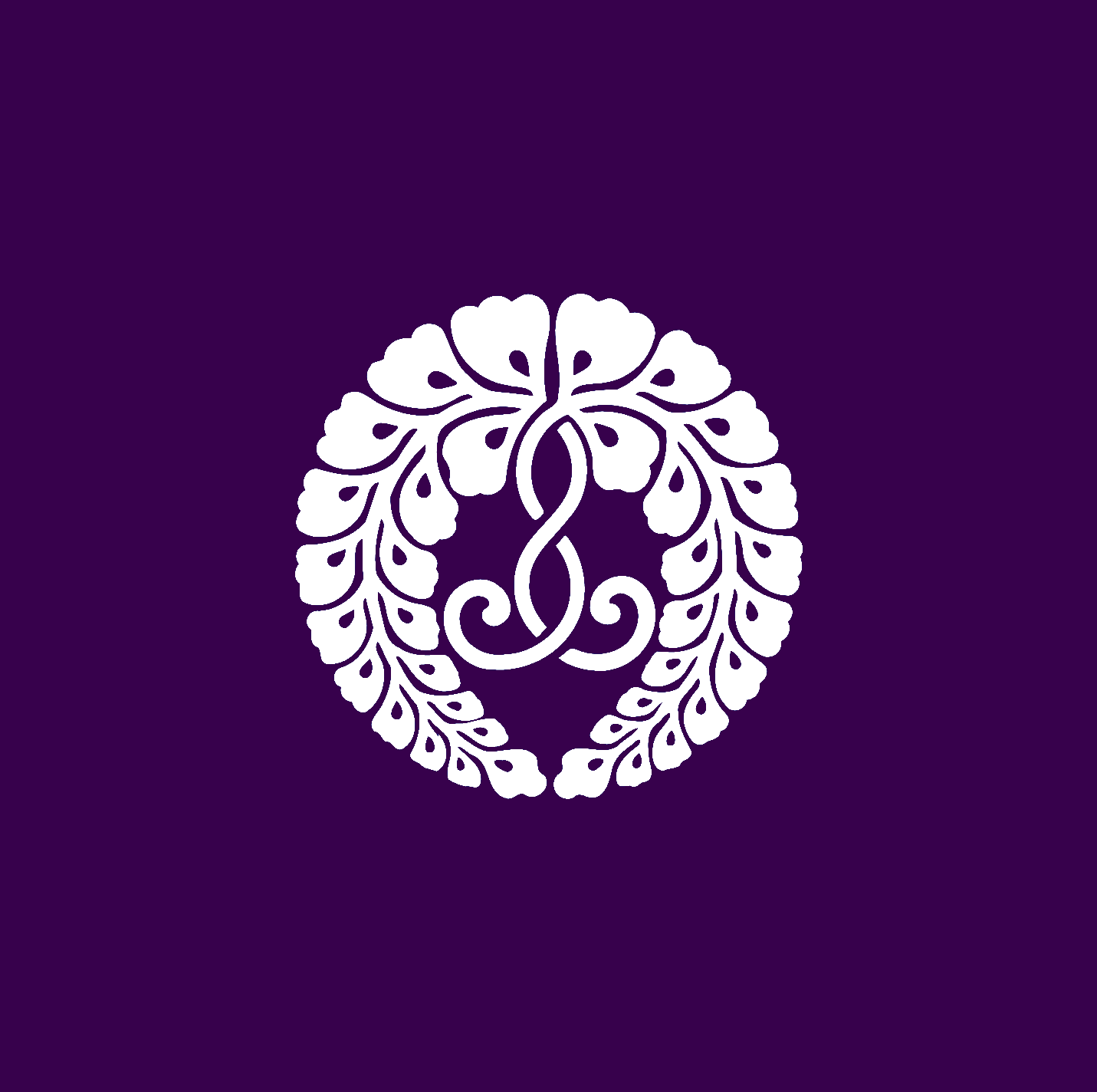
Jōdo Shinshū Honganji flag with Kujokamon emblem

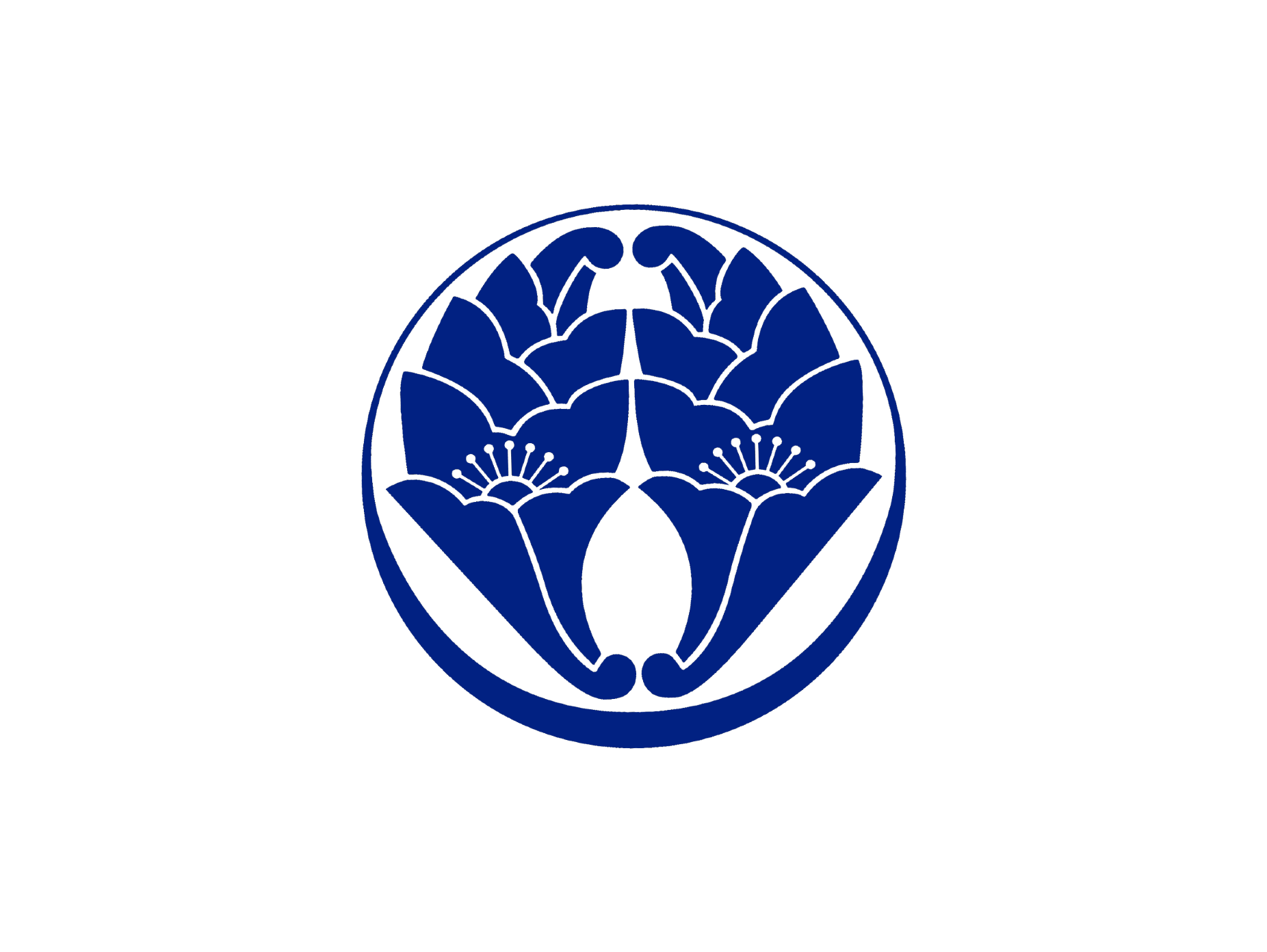
Jōdo-shū flag with the crest (mon) of the school. These flags are sold on the main website of the Japanese sect.

The flag of the Soka Gakkai movement

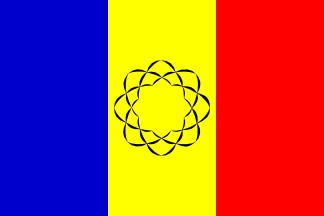
The flag of Soka Gakkai International

== Bans ==
In 1963, the Catholic President of South Vietnam Ngo Dinh Diem invoked a law prohibiting flags other than that of the nation, to ban the Buddhist flag from being flown on Vesak, when Vatican flags had habitually flown at government events. This led to protests, which were ended by lethal firing of weapons, starting the Buddhist crisis.

== See also ==
- Bhagwa Dhwaj
- Dhvaja, banner-like flag in Sanskrit & Hinduism with a distinctive long flowing frontal tail
- Culture of Buddhism
- Dharmachakra
