= Neil Hewavitarne =

Ceylonese businessman and politician

Neil Kamal Hewavitarne (1904 – 30 October 1939) was a Ceylonese businessman and politician.

Neil Kamal Hewavitarne was the son of Edmund Hewavitarne and Sujatha née Peiris, and the grandson of Don Carolis Hewavitharana.

During the 1915 riots, when Hewavitarne was eleven his father was arrested and court marshaled for treason. His father died five months later in Jaffna prison.

At the 1931 Ceylonese State Council elections Hewavitarne contested the seat of Udugama, against H. W. Amarasuriya but failed to get elected.

At the next State Council elections in 1936 Amarsuriya contested the seat of Galle and Hewavitarne re-contested Udugama. On 27 February 1936 he was elected as a Member of the 2nd State Council of Ceylon. His brother, Raja was also elected to the State Council, representing Matara.

Hewavitarne died whilst in office on 30 October 1939. His seat on the State Council was filled by Simon Abeywickrema, who won the subsequent by-election held 9 March 1940.

He served as the Chairman of H. Don Carolis and Sons after his father died.
