= Homagama Electoral District =

Electoral district of Sri Lanka

Homagama electoral district was an electoral district of Sri Lanka between March 1960 and February 1989. The district was named after the town of Homagama in Colombo District, Western Province. The 1978 Constitution of Sri Lanka introduced the proportional representation electoral system for electing members of Parliament. The existing 160 mainly single-member electoral districts were replaced with 22 multi-member electoral districts. Homagama electoral district was replaced by the Colombo multi-member electoral district at the 1989 general elections.

== Members of Parliament ==
Key

Independent SLFP UNP LSSP

Election	Member	Party	Term
1960 (March)	Gamini Jayasuriya	UNP	1960-1960
1960 (July)	Gamini Jayasuriya	UNP	1960-1965
1965	Gamini Jayasuriya	UNP	1965-1970
1970	Wilfred Senanayake	LSSP	1970-1977
1977	Gamini Jayasuriya	UNP	1977-1989

== Elections ==
=== 1960 (March) Parliamentary General Election ===
Results of the 4th parliamentary election held on 19 March 1960:

Candidate	Party	Symbol	Votes	%
Gamini Jayasuriya	United National Party	Elephant	10,873	40.45
D. F. Welikala		Cartwheel	10,219	38.02
Wilfred Senanayake		Key	5,221	19.42
H. P. Liyanage		Umbrella	280	1.56
Vincent Perera		Flower	128	0.48
Valid Votes			26,721	99.41
Rejected Votes			159	0.59
Total Polled			26,880	100.00
Registered Electors			32,482	
Turnout				82.75

=== 1960 (July) Parliamentary General Election ===
Results of the 5th parliamentary election held on 20 July 1960:

Candidate	Party	Symbol	Votes	%
Gamini Jayasuriya	United National Party	Elephant	12,504	47.11
D. F. Welikala		Cartwheel	9,434	35.54
D. W. Mayadunna		Hand	4,201	15.83
Valid Votes			26,439	99.61
Rejected Votes			104	0.39
Total Polled			26,543	100.00
Registered Electors			32,482	
Turnout				81.72

=== 1965 Parliamentary General Election ===
Results of the 6th parliamentary election held on 22 March 1965:

Candidate	Party	Symbol	Votes	%
Gamini Jayasuriya	United National Party	Elephant	17,149	50.35
Wilfred Senanayake		Key	15,354	45.08
Tilake Kulasekera		Cartwheel	1,418	4.16
Valid Votes			33,921	99.59
Rejected Votes			140	0.41
Total Polled			34,061	100.00
Registered Electors			40,751	
Turnout				83.58

=== 1970 Parliamentary General Election ===
Results of the 7th parliamentary election held on 27 May 1970:

Candidate	Party	Symbol	Votes	%
Wilfred Senanayake	Lanka Sama Samaja Party	Key	24,730	58.00
Gamini Jayasuriya	United National Party	Elephant	17,471	40.98
Somapala Mayadunnage		Bell	320	0.75
Valid Votes			42,521	99.73
Rejected Votes			114	0.27
Total Polled			42,635	100.00
Registered Electors			47,270	
Turnout			90.19	

=== 1977 Parliamentary General Election ===
Results of the 8th parliamentary election held on 21 July 1977:

Candidate	Party	Symbol	Votes	%
Gamini Jayasuriya	United National Party	Elephant	29,540	57.80
A. A. Yasaratgne Amaratunga	Sri Lanka Freedom Party	Hand	15,152	29.65
Wilfred Senanayake	Lanka Sama Samaja Party	Key	6,012	11.76
Soma Senanayake		Cartwheel	253	0.49
Valid Votes			50,957	99.71
Rejected Votes			150	0.29
Total Polled			51,107	100.00
Registered Electors			58,568	
Turnout				87.26
