= Raja Hewavitarne =

Ceylonese businessman and politician

Rajasinghe Hewavitarne, CBE, JP (1 November 1898 – 1959) was a Ceylonese businessman and politician, who was elected a member of the 2nd State Council of Ceylon in 1936.

== Family life and education ==
Rajasinghe Hewavitarne was born on 1 November 1898 in Colombo, the eldest son of Edmund Hewavitarne and Sujatha née Peiris, and the grandson of Don Carolis Hewavitharana. During the 1915 riots, when Hewavitarne was seventeen his father was arrested and court martialed for treason. His father died five months later in Jaffna prison.

Hewavitarne was educated at Dulwich College, London and Coventry Technical College, which included training at the Humber motor vehicle plant in Coventry. He returned to Ceylon and took a position as a partner and engineer at the family company, H. Don Carolis and Sons.

On 30 October 1931 he married Nora Rajakurna, from Kitulgala with whom he had two children Lalit and Hemamala.

== Political career ==
At the State Council elections in 1936 Hewavitarne contested the seat of Matara. On 27 February 1936 he was elected as a Member of the 2nd State Council of Ceylon, where he served on the Executive Committee for Labour, Industry and Commerce. His younger brother, Neil, was also elected to the State Council, representing Udugama.

In the 1949 New Year Honours Hewavitarne was appointed to the Order of the British Empire and in the 1952 Queens Birthday Honours was appointed a Commander of the Order of the British Empire (Civil Division).

In 1956 he was appointed as Ceylon's Envoy to Burma (Myanmar).
