= Wilfred Senanayake =

Sri Lankan politician (1918–2008)

Hon. Wilfred Senanayake

Member of Parliament for Homagama
- In office 1970–1977
- Preceded by: Gamini Jayasuriya
- Succeeded by: Gamini Jayasuriya

Personal details
- Born: 10 November 1918 Homagama, Sri Lanka
- Died: 26 May 2008 (aged 89)
- Party: Lanka Sama Samaja Party
- Spouse: Yasawathi Dolaweera
- Education: Nalanda College Colombo
- Occupation: Politics

Wilfred Senanayake (10 November 1918 — 26 May 2008) was a Sri Lankan politician who served as member of Parliament for Homagama.

== Biography ==
He was educated at Nalanda College Colombo and later, unbeknownst to his parents, joined the army.

He joined the Lanka Sama Samaja Party and was the first Leftist chairman of the Village Council in his area. When LSSP members who were imprisoned by the British were released in 1945, Wilfred Senanayake took the initiative to organise rallies throughout the country. He led the Hartal in the Kelani Valley in 1953.

=== Career ===
He was elected to Parliament from Homagama in 1970, in which capacity he built a reputation as a representative of the poor and ordinary people. He protested that the extent of lands that could be owned by one person should be limited to 25 acres (100,000 m^{2}) while there was a suggestion that it be limited to 250 acres (1.0 km^{2}) under the 1972 Land Reform. Later the extent was limited to 50 acres (200,000 m^{2}).

In 1982, together with politicians Anil Moonesinghe, Cholomondely Goonewardena and G. E. H. Perera he formed the Sri Lanka Sama Samaja Party (SLSSP).

== Legacy ==
In appreciation of his yeoman service to the people of Homagama, the Wilfred Senanayake Ground was established there.
