= Miranda de Souza Canavarro =

American theosophist (1849–1933)

Miranda de Souza Canavarro (1849-1933) was a wealthy American theosophist notable as the first woman to convert to Buddhism in the United States, in 1897. She later moved to Ceylon and became a Buddhist nun. She became known as Sister Sanghamitta, while in America she was often known as Marie.

A socialite, she was married to the Portuguese ambassador to the Sandwich Islands (now called Hawaii), controlled by the US. Canavarro began a secret "spiritual marriage" to New York attorney and Buddhist sympathizer Myron Henry Phelps. She converted to Buddhism in 1897 under the discipleship of Anagarika Dharmapala, and moved to Ceylon as Sister Sanghamitta.

Canavarro wrote several novels, which drew upon her own experiences. These include Insight Into the Far East (1925), The Poison Orchid (1930), The Aztec Chief (1931) and The Broken Vase (1933).
