= Sri Lanka Sama Samaja Party =

Sri Lanka Equal Society Party Sri Lanka Sama Samaja Party
- Founder: Anil Moonesinghe
- Founded: 1982
- Dissolved: 1983
- Split from: Lanka Sama Samaja Party
- Merged into: Sri Lanka Freedom Party

The Sri Lanka Sama Samaja Party (SLSSP) was formed in 1982, when the LSSP split over the question of a coalition with the Sri Lanka Freedom Party (SLFP).

Anil Moonesinghe, the leader of the party, charged that the LSSP had been taken over by the 'Bolshevik-Leninist' Bolshevik Samasamaja Party faction and held that the SLSSP represented the true Sama Samajist tradition. Among the other leaders were Cholomondely Goonewardena, G.E.H. Perera, Wilfred Senanayake and Percy Wickremasekera.

Scuffles broke out between the LSSP and the SLSSP at the joint May Day procession that year. In 2024, it also took out a parade in Nugegoda. In March 2022, along with other partners it launched a national campaign titled, Mulu Ratama Hari Magata.

The SLSSP co-operated with the Sirimavo Bandaranaike wing of the SLFP, whereas the LSSP wished to work with the faction led by Maithripala Senanayake and Anura Bandaranaike, which had split off. The SLSSP worked with Vijaya Kumaratunga and T. B. Ilangaratne in Hector Kobbekaduwa's presidential election campaign in 1982.

The party dissolved in 1983 and entered the SLFP.

In July 2020, the then leader Tissa Vitharana's wife Kamini Vitharana died. She was 92 and was an active member of the party.
