= Prabashvara =

Mythical colour in Buddhism

The last strip showing Prabhasvara, mixture of all the previous five colors in Buddhist flag.

Prabhashvara is the color of the aura of Gautama Buddha which was seen radiating from his body according to Buddhist traditions and is depicted on the Buddhist flag.

== Description ==
Prabhashvara means "brilliant" or "shining". The prabhashvara is considered be the spectrum of Buddha's aura and consists of five colors, in Pāli:

- nīla (sapphire blue)
- pīta (golden yellow)
- lohitaka (crimson)
- odāta (white)
- mañjeṭṭha (orange or scarlet)

== Interpretation ==
=== Racist interpretation ===
According to Purana Kassapa and Makkali Gosala, these six colors could also be interpreted a six species, races, or categories of human beings distinguished by genetic, physical, moral or psychological traits, which no individual can change or influence through his own will. The black color included butchers, hunters, fishers, thieves, and all those who practise cruel deeds. The other five categories are on placed on a decreasing scale of perversity and increasing holiness. The white is for the absolutely pure, whose holiness is innate. However, Gautama Buddha opposed this racist classification as according to his teaching, men should not be judged by their birth but rather by their own deeds.

== Use: the aureola and the flag ==
The mixture of those five colors is believed to be Prabhashvara but it is depicted as separate strips of the five colors.

The flag was originally designed in 1885 by the Colombo Committee, in Colombo, Ceylon, in modern day Sri Lanka. The prabashvara was suggested by Henry Steel Olcott to give the Buddhist flag a strong identity more than two thousand years after Buddha's "parinirvana" to represent the Buddhism as a religion.

== See also ==
- Buddhist flag
- Five Pure Lights
- Parinirvana
- Rainbow body
