= Edmund Hewavitarne =

Sri Lankan businessman

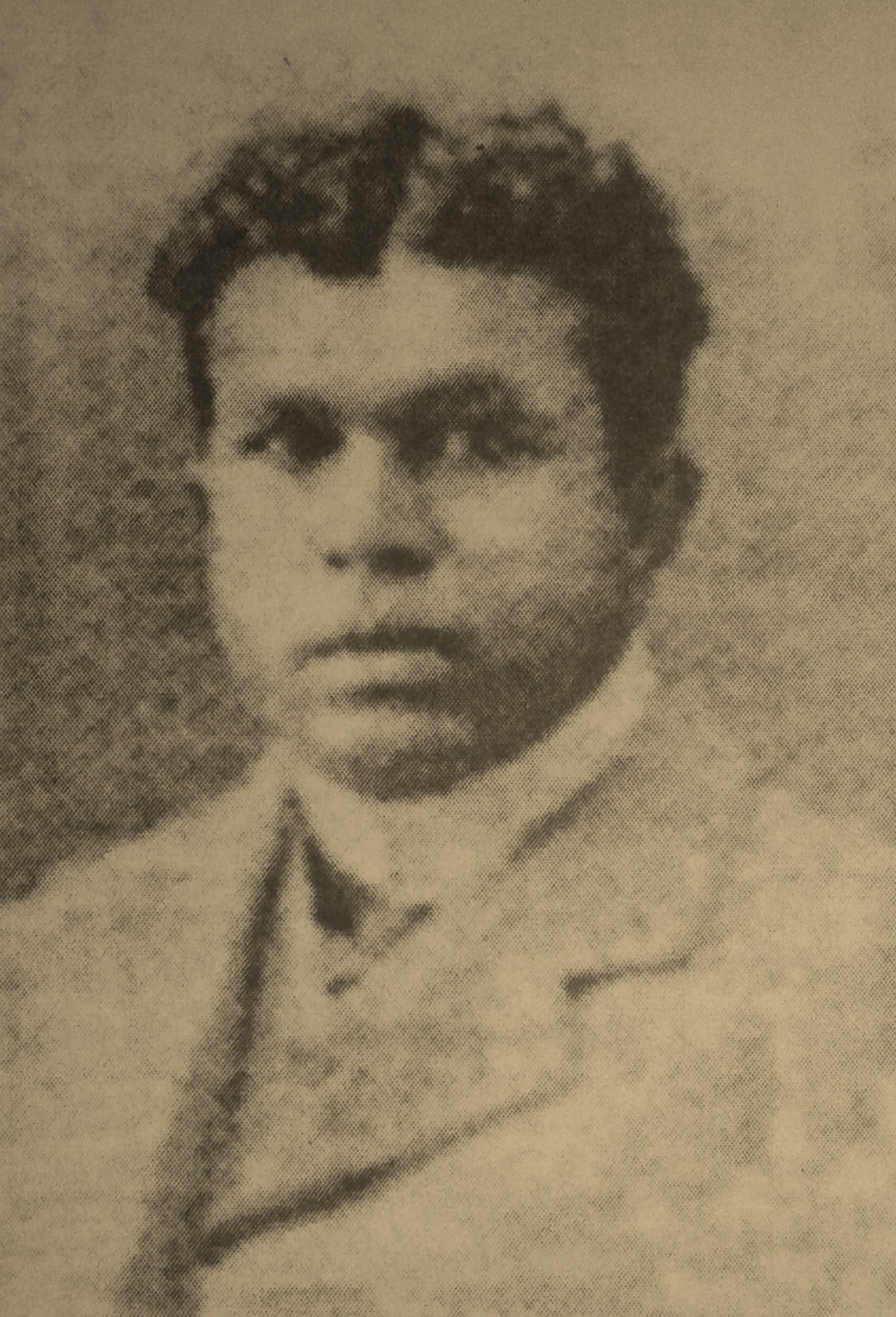
Edmund Hewavitharana.

Edmund Hewavitarne (1873 – 19 November 1915) was a Ceylonese (Sri Lankan) businessman and reservist. A member of Ceylon Defence Force, he was court-martialed for treason and died in prison, he was given posthumous pardon. He was the younger brother of Anagarika Dharmapala.

Born to the rich Hewavitarne family, his father was Don Carolis Hewavitharana and Mallika Dharmagunawardhana (the daughter of Andiris Perera Dharmagunawardhana) was his mother. His brothers were Anagarika Dharmapala and Charles Alwis Hewavitharana.

During the 1915 riots he was arrested on false pretenses and court-martialed for treason and shop-breaking. Sentenced to penal servitude for life after a three-day trial he was detained in the Welikada Prison and was transferred to the Jaffna Prison, where after five months of imprisonment he died on 19 November of enteric fever, due to lack of medical treatment.

Philip Morrell raised the matter of the death of Hewavitarne in the House of Commons. However, Walter Long, the Secretary of State for the Colonies refused to allow an impartial Inquiry into cases of miscarriage of justice in the courts-martial and into the general administration of martial law during and after the Ceylon disturbances.

He served as the Chairman of H. Don Carolis and Sons where he grew and diversified the business into new markets as well as new industries.

He had four children. Neil Hewavitarne, Rajah Hewavitarne, Sumanadevi Jayasuriya and Daya Hewavitarne.
