= Don Carolis Hewavitharana =

Sri Lankan businessman (1833–1906)

Don Carolis Hewavitarne Wijeyaguneratne
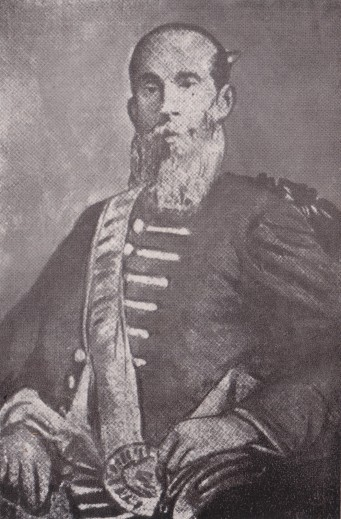
- Born: 1833; Yatiyana, Hittetiya, Matara
- Died: 18 February 1906 (aged 72–73)
- Occupations: Businessman, industrialist & philanthropist
- Title: Mudaliyar
- Spouse: Mallika Dharmagunawardhana
- Children: Don David Hewavitarne, Edmund Hewavitarne, Simon Alexander Hewavitarne, Charles Alwis Hewavitarne, Dona Engeltina Hewavitarne
- Parent: Hewavitarne Dingiri Appuhamy

Don Carolis Hewavitarne Wijeyaguneratne (Sinhala: දොන් කරෝලිස් හේවාවිතාරණ) (1833 – 18 February 1906) was a Ceylonese businessman, industrialist, philanthropist and a pioneer of the Buddhist revival movement. He was the father of Anagarika Dharmapala, and founded a family of considerable influence.

== Early life ==
He was born in Yatiyana, Hittetiya, Matara, the son of Hewavitarne Dingiri Appuhamy. He was educated at Hittatiya Raja Maha Vihara by the Ven. Mirrise Revatha. His brother became a monk at the same monastery, and later its leader.

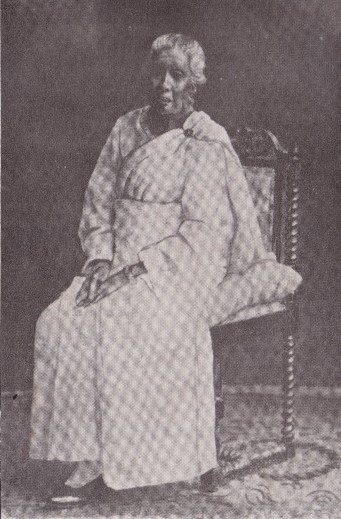
Lady Mallika Dharmagunawardhana.

In 1860, Don Carolis married Mallika Dharmagunawardhana, the daughter of Lansige Lansige Andiris Perera Dharmagunawardhana, a wealthy businessman from Colombo. The couple had five children, Don David Hewavitarne, who later changed his name to Anagarika Dharmapala and became a prominent figure in the Buddhist revival movement in Ceylon and in India; Dr C. A. Hewavitarne, a prominent physician and independence activist; Edmund Hewavitarne; Simon Alexander Hewavitarne, and Dona Engeltina Moonesinghe.

== H.Don Carolis & Sons ==
As dowry, Don Carolis received a furniture shop in the Pettah, which became H. Don Carolis and Sons Ltd, one of the largest and most reputable furniture companies in Asia. In 1886 H.Don Carolis & Sons exported furniture to Australia. An Indo-Afric syndicate was formed in London in 1895 to carry out a large furniture business with South Africa. This led to the establishment of the firm’s first factory, 'Steam Furniture Works' on Slave Island. The firm became the dominant furniture maker in the country.

By the turn of the century, the firm was exporting to Australia, South Africa, India, Burma, the UK, Europe & the USA. Don Carolis received gold and silver medals for furniture exhibited at the Ceylon Agricultural Exhibitions, the Indian Industrial Exhibition of 1901, the Paris Exhibition of 1900, and the Saint Louis Exposition of 1904.

== Buddhist revival ==
Until 1884, Buddhists were forced by the colonial authorities to declare themselves Christian. This was changed after Col. Henry Steel Olcott made representations to Secretary of State for the Colonies in London on behalf of the Buddhists of Sri Lanka.

The Buddhism Protection Committee (also known as the Colombo Committee) was formed in January 1884 under the patronage of Colonel Olcott, mainly with the objective of getting the Vesak full-moon day holiday restored. The British had not shown any interest in restoring the Vesak holiday, which the Buddhists lost in 1770 during the period of Dutch rule. Dharma Gunawardena was elected President with Don Carolis as Vice President. In 1885 the Vesak holiday was restored and the committee elected a steering committee, to which Don Carolis and his father-in-law were again elected, which went on to design the Buddhist flag.

== Descendants ==
The most notable of his grandchildren were:

- Neil Hewavitharana
- Raja Hewavitharana
- Kumaradas Moonesinghe, founding Managing Director of the Elephant Match Company

The most prominent members of the next generation were:

- Anil Moonesinghe MP, Cabinet Minister, Deputy Speaker and Ambassador
- Gamini Jayasuriya MP, Cabinet Minister
- Susil Moonesinghe MP, Chief Minister and Ambassador
- Mangala Moonesinghe MP and High Commissioner
