= Andiris Perera Dharmagunawardhana =

Sri Lankan businessman and philanthropist (1809–1890)

Muhandiram Lansage Andiris Perera Dharmagunawardhana (19 November 1809 – 24 January 1890) was a Sri Lankan businessman, a philanthropist, and a pioneer of the Buddhist revival movement. He was the grandfather of Anagarika Dharmapala.

He owned extensive land on the hill of Maligakanda, in present-day Maradana, Colombo, as well as two shops in Pettah, Colombo.

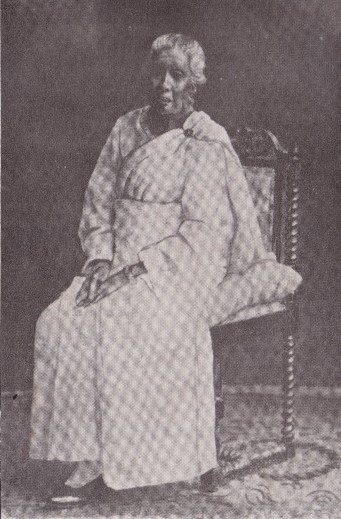
Lady Mallika Dharmagunawardhana

In 1860, he gave his daughter, Mallika, in marriage to Don Carolis Hewavitharana. As dowry, he gave his son-in-law one of his two shops. This become the renowned furniture shop, H Don Carolis & Sons.

He donated land and money to found, at Maligakanda in 1872, a Buddhist Seminary, the Vidyodaya Oriental College, better known as the Vidyodaya Pirivena, which later became the basis for Vidyodaya University.

In 1880 the Buddhist Theosophical Society was founded, with Dharmagunawardena as its president, an office he held until his demise ten years later.

Until 1884, Buddhists were forced by the colonial authorities to convert to Christianity. This was changed after Colonel Henry Steel Olcott made representations to Secretary of State for the Colonies in London on behalf of the Buddhists of Sri Lanka.

The Buddhism Protection Committee (also known as the Colombo Committee) was formed in January 1884 under the patronage of Colonel Olcott, mainly with the objective of getting the Vesak full-moon day holiday restored. The British had not shown any interest in restoring the Vesak holiday which the Buddhists lost in 1770 during the Dutch rule. Dharmagunawardena was elected President - again a post he held until his demise - with Don Carolis as Vice President. In 1885 the Vesak holiday was restored and the committee elected a steering committee, to which Dharmagunawardena and his son-in-law were again elected, which went on to design the Buddhist flag.

About three thousand people attended his funeral, at which the customary funeral orations were made by Colonel Olcott and Ven. Gnanisara. His ashes are interred on the grounds (donated by him) of the Vidyodaya Pirivena at Maligakanda.
