= Anagarika Dharmapala =

Sri Lankan Buddhist revivalist and writer (1864-1933)

Anagarika Dharmapāla
- අනගාරික ධර්‍මපාල
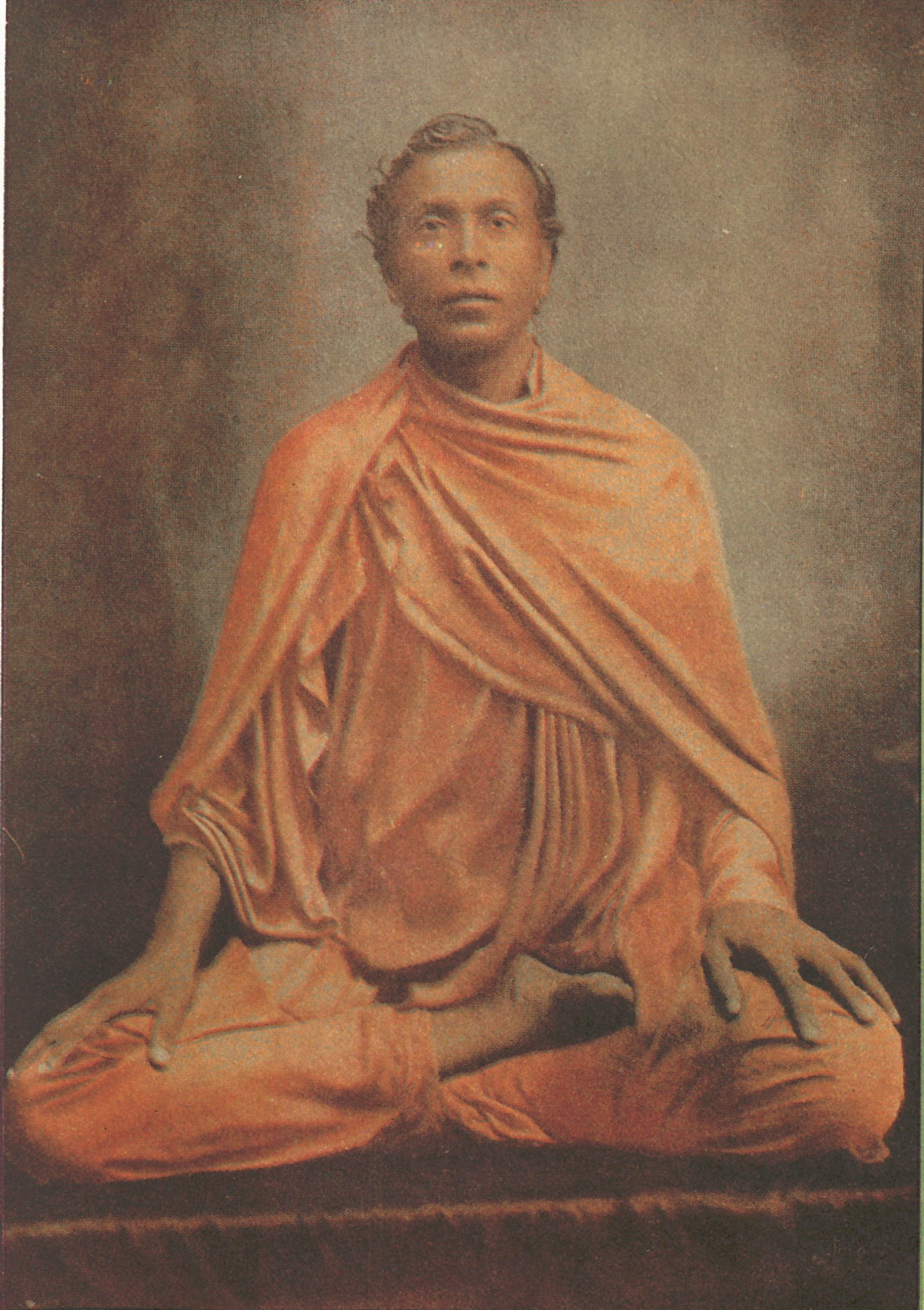
- Srimath Anagarika Dharmapāla
- Born: Don David Hewavitarne; 17 September 1864; Matara, Ceylon
- Died: 29 April 1933 (aged 68); Sarnath, British India
- Other name: Ven. Sri Devamitta Dharmapala (after ordination)
- Education: Christian College, Kotte, St Benedict's College, Kotahena, S. Thomas' College, Mutwal, Colombo Academy
- Known for: Sri Lankan independence movement, Revival of Buddhism, Representing Buddhism in the Parliament of World Religions (1893), Buddhist missionary work in three continents
- Parent(s): Don Carolis Hewavitharana; Mallika Dharmagunawardhana

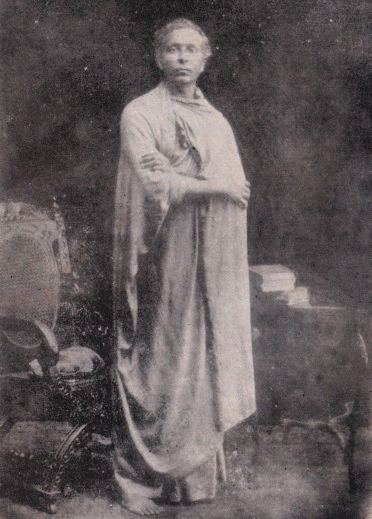
Srimath Anagarika Dharmapala

Anagārika Dharmapāla (born Don David Hewavitarne, Pali: Anagārika, [ɐˈnɐɡaːɽɪkɐ]; Sinhala: Anagārika, lit., Sinhala: අනගාරික ධර්‍මපාල; 17 September 1864 – 29 April 1933) was a Sri Lankan Buddhist revivalist and a writer.

Along with Henry Steel Olcott and Helena Blavatsky, the creators of the Theosophical Society, he was a major reformer and revivalist of Sinhala Buddhism and an important figure in its western transmission. He also inspired a mass movement of South Indian Dalits including Tamils to embrace Buddhism, half a century before B. R. Ambedkar. In his later life, he became a Buddhist monk with the name of Venerable Sri Devamitta Dharmapala.

== Early life and education ==
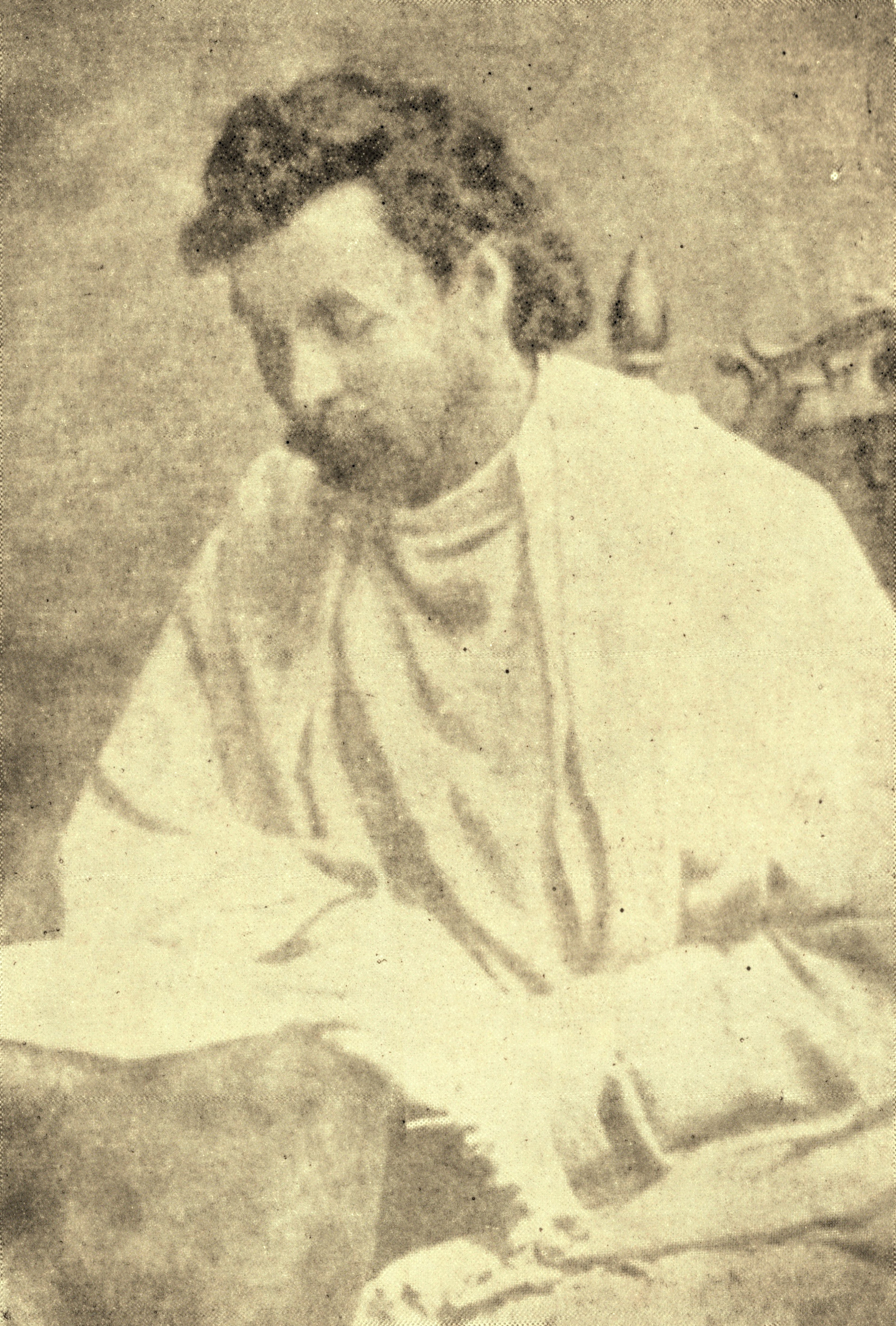
Srimath Anagarika Dharmapala at the age of 29 (1893)

Anagarika Dharmapala was born on 17 September 1864 in Colombo, Ceylon to Don Carolis Hewavitharana of Hiththetiya, Matara and Mallika Dharmagunawardhana (the daughter of Andiris Perera Dharmagunawardhana), who were among the richest merchants of Ceylon at the time. He was named Don David Hewavitarne. His younger brothers were Charles Alwis Hewavitharana and Edmund Hewavitarne. He attended Christian College, Kotte; St Benedict's College, Kotahena; S. Thomas' College, Mutwal and the Colombo Academy (Royal College).

== Buddhist revival ==
In 1875, during a period of Buddhist revival, Helena Blavatsky and Henry Steel Olcott had founded the Theosophical Society in New York City. They were both very sympathetic to what they understood of Buddhism, and in 1880 they arrived in Ceylon, declared themselves to be Buddhists, and publicly took the Refuges and Precepts from a prominent Sinhalese bhikkhu. Olcott made several subsequent trips to Ceylon, where he devoted himself to the cause of Buddhist education. He founded many Buddhist schools, some of which are still in existence. It was during this period that Hewavitharane changed his name to Anagarika Dharmapala.

'Dharmapāla' means "protector of the dharma". 'Anagārika' in Pāli means "homeless one". It is a midway status between monk and layperson. As such, he took the eight precepts (refrain from killing, stealing, sexual misconduct, wrong speech, intoxicating drinks and drugs, eating after noon, entertainments and fashionable attire, and luxurious beds) for life. These eight precepts were commonly taken by Ceylonese laypeople on observance days. But for a person to take them for life was highly unusual. Dharmapala was the first anagarika – that is, a celibate, full-time worker for Buddhism – in modern times. It seems that he took a vow of celibacy at the age of eight and remained faithful to it all his life. Although he wore a yellow robe, it was not of the traditional bhikkhu pattern, and he did not shave his head. He felt that the observance of all the vinaya rules would get in the way of his work, especially as he flew around the world. Neither the title nor the office became popular, but in this role, he "was the model for lay activism in modernist Buddhism." He is considered a bodhisattva in Sri Lanka.

His trip to Bodh Gaya was inspired by an 1885 visit there by Sir Edwin Arnold, author of The Light of Asia, who soon started advocating for the renovation of the site and its return to Buddhist care. Arnold was directed towards this endeavour by Weligama Sri Sumangala Thera.

At the invitation of Paul Carus, he returned to the U.S. in 1896, and again in 1902–1904, where he traveled and taught widely.

Dharmapala eventually broke with Olcott and the Theosophists because of Olcott's stance on universal religion. "One of the important factors in his rejection of theosophy centred on this issue of universalism; the price of Buddhism being assimilated into a non-Buddhist model of truth was ultimately too high for him." Dharmapala stated that Theosophy was "only consolidating Krishna worship". "To say that all religions have a common foundation only shows the ignorance of the speaker; Dharma alone is supreme to the Buddhist."

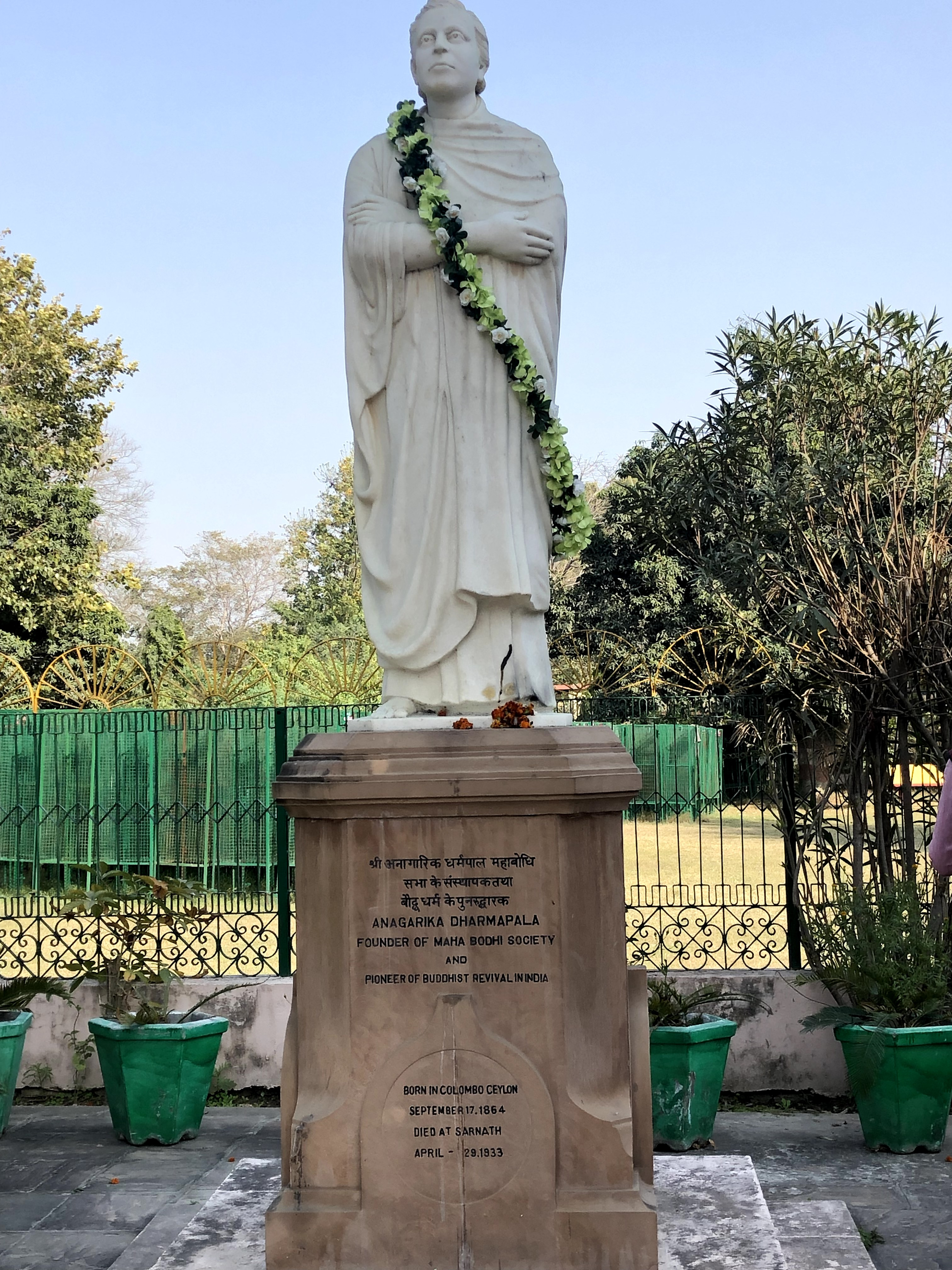
Statue of Angarika Dharamapalan in Sarnath

At Sarnath in 1933 he was ordained as a bhikkhu, and he died at Sarnath in December of that year, aged 68.

== Religious work ==
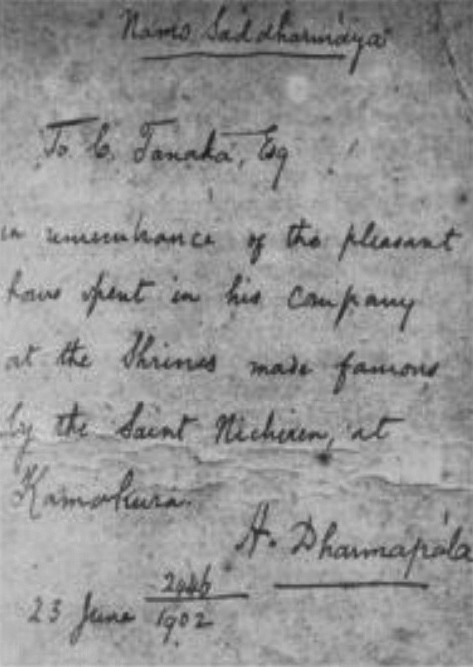
A letter written by Srimath Dharmapala on 23 June 1902 to a friend in Japan.

The young Dharmapala helped Colonel Olcott in his work, particularly by acting as his translator. Dharmapala also became quite close to Madame Blavatsky, who advised him to study Pāli and to work for the good of humanity – which is what he did. It was at this time that he changed his name to Dharmapala (meaning "Guardian of the Dharma").

In 1891 Anagarika Dharmapala was on a pilgrimage to the recently restored Mahabodhi Temple, where Siddhartha Gautama – the Buddha – attained enlightenment at Bodh Gaya, India. Here he experienced a shock to find the temple in the hands of a Saivite priest, the Buddha image transformed into a Hindu icon and Buddhists barred from worship. As a result, he began an agitation movement.

The Maha Bodhi Society at Colombo was founded in 1891 but its offices were soon moved to Calcutta the following year in 1892. One of its primary aims was the restoration to Buddhist control of the Mahabodhi Temple at Bodh Gaya, the chief of the four ancient Buddhist holy sites. To accomplish this, Dharmapala initiated a lawsuit against the Brahmin priests who had held control of the site for centuries. After a protracted struggle, this was successful only after Indian independence (1947) and sixteen years after Dharmapala's own death (1933), with the partial restoration of the site to the management of the Maha Bodhi Society in 1949. It was then the temple management of Bodh Gaya was entrusted to a committee comprised in equal numbers of Hindus and Buddhists. A statue of Anagarika Dharmapala was established in College Square near Kolkata Maha Bodhi Society.

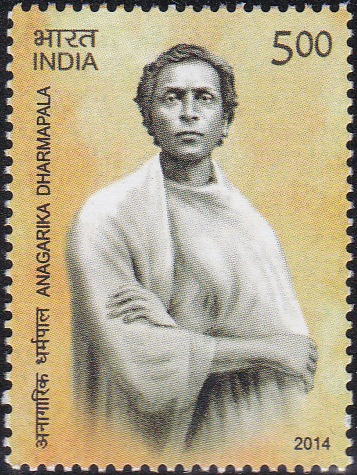
Anagarika on a 2014 stamp of India

Maha Bodhi Society centers were set up in many Indian cities, and this had the effect of raising Indian consciousness about Buddhism. Converts were made mostly among the educated, but also among some low caste Indians in the south.

Voice of Srimath Anagarika Dharmapala / Excerpt from a Public Speech.

Voice of Srimath Anagarika Dharmapala / Excerpt from a Dhamma Deshana.

Due to the efforts of Dharmapala, the site of the Buddha's parinibbana (physical death) at Kushinagar has once again become a major attraction for Buddhists, as it was for many centuries previously. Mahabodhi Movement in 1890s held the Muslim rule in India responsible for the decay of Buddhism in India. Anagarika Dharmapala did not hesitate to lay the chief blame for the decline of Buddhism in India at the door of Muslim fanaticism.

In 1893 Dharmapala was invited to attend the World Parliament of Religions in Chicago as a representative of "Southern Buddhism" – which was the term applied at that time to the Theravada. There he met Swami Vivekananda and got on very well with him. Like Swami Vivekananda, he was a great success at the Parliament and received a fair bit of media attention. By his early thirties he was already a global figure, continuing to travel and give lectures and establish viharas around the world during the next forty years. At the same time he concentrated on establishing schools and hospitals in Ceylon and building temples and viharas in India. Among the most important of the temples he built was one at Sarnath, where the Buddha first taught. On returning to India via Hawaii, he met Mary E. Foster, a descendant of King Kamehameha who had emotional problems. Dharmapala consoled her using Buddhist techniques; in return, she granted him an enormous donation of over one million rupees (over $2.7 million in 2010 dollars, but worth much more due to low labor costs in India). In 1897 he converted Miranda de Souza Canavarro who as "Sister Sanghamitta" came to establish a school in Ceylon.

Dharmapala's voluminous diaries have been published, and he also wrote some memoirs.

== Dharmapala, science, and Protestant Buddhism ==
The term 'Protestant Buddhism,' coined by scholar Gananath Obeyesekere, is often applied to Dharmapala's form of Buddhism. It is Protestant in two ways. First, it is influenced by Protestant ideals such as freedom from religious institutions, freedom of conscience, and focus on individual interior experience. Second, it is in itself a protest against claims of Christian superiority, colonialism, and Christian missionary work aimed at weakening Buddhism. "Its salient characteristic is the importance it assigns to the laity." It arose among the new, literate, middle class centred in Colombo.

The term 'Buddhist modernism' is used to describe forms of Buddhism that suited the Modern World, usually influenced by modern thinking, and often adapted by Buddhists as a counter to claims of European or Christian superiority. Buddhist modernists emphasise certain aspects of traditional Buddhism, while de-emphasising others. Some of the characteristics of Buddhist modernism are: importance of the laity as against the sangha; rationality and de-emphasis of supernatural and mythological aspects; consistency with (and anticipation of) modern science; emphasis on spontaneity, creativity, and intuition; democratic, anti-institutional character; emphasis on meditation over devotional and ceremonial actions.

Dharmapala is an excellent example of a Buddhist modernist, and perhaps the paradigmatic example of Protestant Buddhism. He was particularly concerned with presenting Buddhism as consistent with science, especially the theory of evolution.

== Survey of writings ==
Most of Dharmapala's works are collected in Return to Righteousness: A Collection of Speeches, Essays, and Letters of the Anagarika Dharmapala. (Edited by Ananda Guruge. Colombo, Ministry of Education and Cultural Affairs (1965)).

=== The World's Debt to Buddha (1893) ===
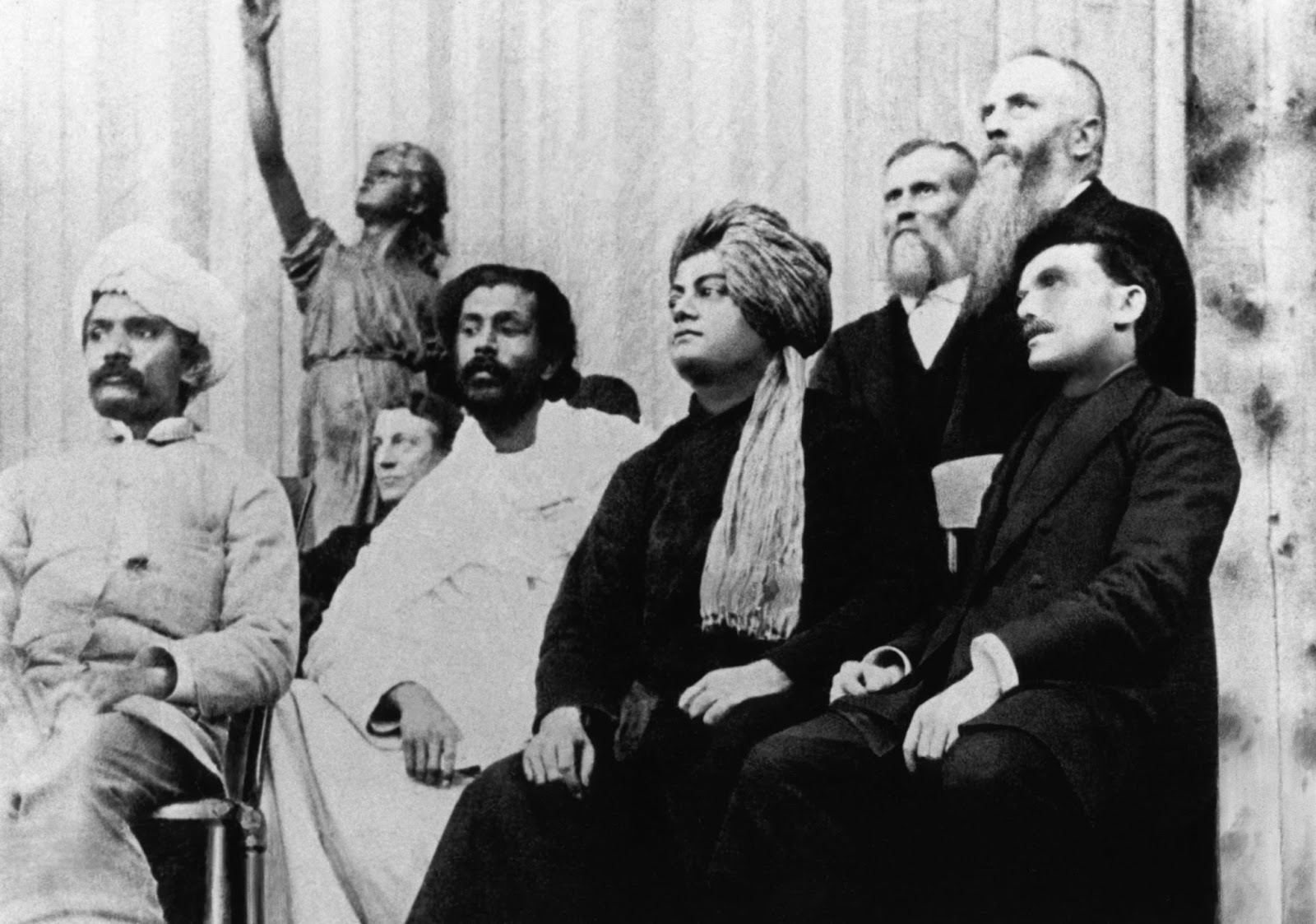
Anagarika Dharmapala at the Parliament of World Religions. From left to right: Virchand Gandhi, Anagarika Dharmapala, Swami Vivekananda, and Gaston Bonet Maury.

This paper was read to a crowded session of the Parliament of World Religions in Chicago, 18 September 1893. At this early stage of his career, Dharmapala was concerned with making Buddhism palatable to his Western audience. This talk is full of references to science, the European Enlightenment, and Christianity. While presenting Buddhism in these familiar terms, he also hints that it is superior to any philosophy of the West. In addition, he spends considerable time discussing the ideal Buddhist polity under Asoka and the Buddha's ethics for lay people.

=== The Constructive Optimism of Buddhism (1915) ===
Buddhism was often portrayed in the West, especially by Christian missionaries, as pessimistic, nihilistic, and passive. One of Dharmapala's main concerns was to counter such claims, and this concern is especially evident in this essay.

=== Message of the Buddha (1925) ===
In the later stages of his career, Dharmapala's vociferous anti-Christian tone is more evident. Dharmapala must be understood in the context of British colonisation of Ceylon and the presence of Christian missionaries there. This work is a good example of "Protestant Buddhism," as described above.

=== Evolution from the Standpoint of Buddhism (1926) ===
Darwin's theory of evolution was the cutting edge of science during Dharmapala's life. As part of his attempt to show that Buddhism is consistent with modern science, he was especially concerned with evolution.

== Contributions to Sinhalese Buddhist Nationalism ==
Dharmapala was one of the primary contributors to the Buddhist revival of the 19th century that led to the creation of Buddhist institutions to match those of the missionaries (schools, the YMBA, etc.), and to the independence movement of the 20th century. DeVotta characterises his rhetoric as having four main points: "(i) Praise – for Buddhism and the Sinhalese culture; (ii) Blame – on the British imperialists, those who worked for them including Christians; (iii) Fear – that Buddhism in Sri Lanka was threatened with extinction; and (iv) Hope – for a rejuvenated Sinhalese Buddhist ascendancy" (78). He illustrated the first three points in a public speech:

This bright, beautiful island was made into a Paradise by the Aryan-Sinhalese before its destruction was brought about by the barbaric vandals. Its people did not know irreligion... Christianity and polytheism [i.e. Hinduism] are responsible for the vulgar practices of killing animals, stealing, licentiousness, lying and drunkenness... The ancient, historic, refined people, under the diabolism of vicious paganism, introduced by the British administrators, are now declining slowly away.

== Later life ==
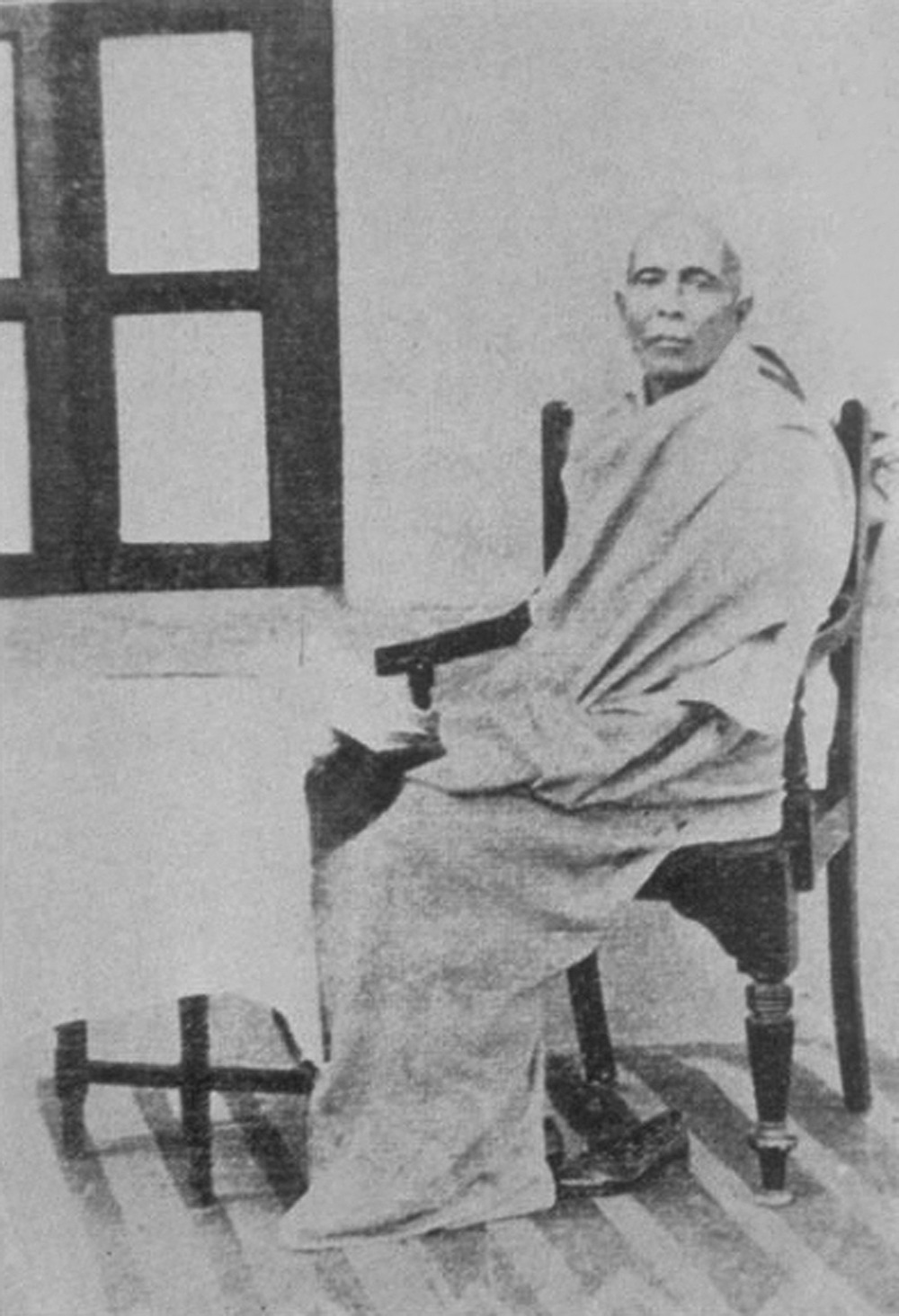
Venerable Sri Devamitta Dharmapala

In the last years of his life, he visited Ceylon in 1931, during which he established the 'Dharmapala Trust'. That year he was ordained a Buddhist monk with the name Sri Devamitta Dharmapala. Two years later he took his higher ordination. He died on 29 April 1933 at the Mulagandhakuti Viharaya in Sarnath, Uttar Pradesh, India.

== Legacy ==
In 2014, India and Sri Lanka issued postage stamps to mark the 150th birth anniversary of Dharmapala, along with the Central Bank of Sri Lanka which issued a commemorative coin. In Colombo, a road has been named in his honour as "Anagarika Dharmapala Mawatha" (Angarika Dharmapala Street).

The biographical film, Anagarika Dharmapala Srimathano, on life history of Dharamapala was released in 2014, where Palitha Silva played the role.

== See also ==
- Kripasaran
- Maha Bodhi Society
- London Buddhist Vihara
- Sri Lanka Maha Bodhi Centre, Chennai
- Miranda de Souza Canavarro
- Walisinghe Harischandra
- Buddhism and Theosophy
- Humanistic Buddhism

== Cited sources ==
- Harvey, Peter (1990). An Introduction to Buddhism: Teachings, History, and Practices. Cambridge: Cambridge University Press. ISBN 9780521313339.
- McMahan, David L. (2009). The Making of Buddhist Modernism. Oxford University Press US. ISBN 978-0-19-518327-6.
- Prothero, Stephen R. (1996). The White Buddhist: The Asian Odyssey of Henry Steel Olcott. Indiana University Press. ISBN 9780253330147.

== Sources ==
- Trevithick, Alan (2006). The revival of Buddhist pilgrimage at Bodh Gaya (1811–1949): Anagarika Dharmapala and the Mahabodhi Temple. Motilal Banarsidass Publishers. ISBN 978-81-208-3107-0.
- Anagarika Dharmapala Archive at Vipassana Fellowship
- WWW Virtual Library: ANAGARIKA DHARMAPALA at www.lankalibrary.com
- Anagarika Dharmapala, The Arya Dharma – Free eBook
- DeVotta, N. (March 2001). "The Utilisation of Religio-Linguistic Identities by the Sinhalese and Bengalis: Toward a General Explanation". Commonwealth & Comparative Politics. 39 (1): 66–95. doi:10.1080/713999534. S2CID 143044760.
- Ven. Kiribathgoda Gnanananda Thero, 'Budu Sasuna Bebala Wu Asahaya Dharma Duthayano', Divaina, 17 September 2008
- Sangharakshita, Flame in Darkness: The Life and Sayings of Anagarika Dharmapala, Triratna Grantha Mala, Poona 1995
- Sangharakshita, Anagarika Dharmapala, a Biographical Sketch, and other Maha Bodhi Writings, Ibis Publications, 2013
- Daya Sirisena, 'Anagarika Dharmapala – Trail-blazing servant of the Buddha', Daily News, 17 September 2004
- Anagarika Dharmapala A religio-cultural hero
- Bartholomeusz, Tessa J. 1993. "Dharmapala at Chicago : Mahayana Buddhist or Sinhala Chauvinist?" Museum of Faiths. Atlanta : Scholars Pr. 235–250.
- Kloppenborg, Ria. 1992. "The Anagarika Dharmapala (1864–1933) and the Puritan Pattern". Nederlands Theologisch Tijdschrift, 46:4, 277–283.
- McMahan, David L. 2008. The Making of Buddhist Modernism. Oxford: Oxford University Press. 91–97, 110–113.
- Obeyesekere, Gananath 1976. "Personal Identity and Cultural Crisis : the Case of Anagārika Dharmapala of Sri Lanka." Biographical Process. The Hague : Mouton. 221–252.
- Prothero, Stephen. 1996a. "Henry Steel Olcott, Anagarika Dharmapala and the Maha Bodhi Society." Theosophical History, 6:3, 96–106.
- Prothero, Stephen. 1996b. The White Buddhist: The Asian Odyssey of Henry Steel Olcott. Bloomington: Indiana University Press.
- Saroja, G V. 1992. "The Contribution of Anagarika Devamitta Dharmapāla to the Revival of Buddhism in India." Buddhist Themes in Modern Indian Literature, Madras : Inst. of Asian Studies. 27–38.
- Amunugama, Sarath, 2016 " The Lion's Roar: Anagarika Dharmapala & the Making of Modern Buddhism" Colombo: Vijitha Yapa Publications.

=== Genealogy ===
- Genealogical Charts of Sri Lankan Sinhalese Families: Family #3006 (Wijeyaguneratne) Don Carolis Hewavitharana
- Genealogical Charts of Sri Lankan Sinhalese Families: Family #3007 DHARMAGUNEWARDENA, Lansage Andiris Perera
