= Relics of Sariputta and Moggallana =

Relics of two main disciples of the Buddha

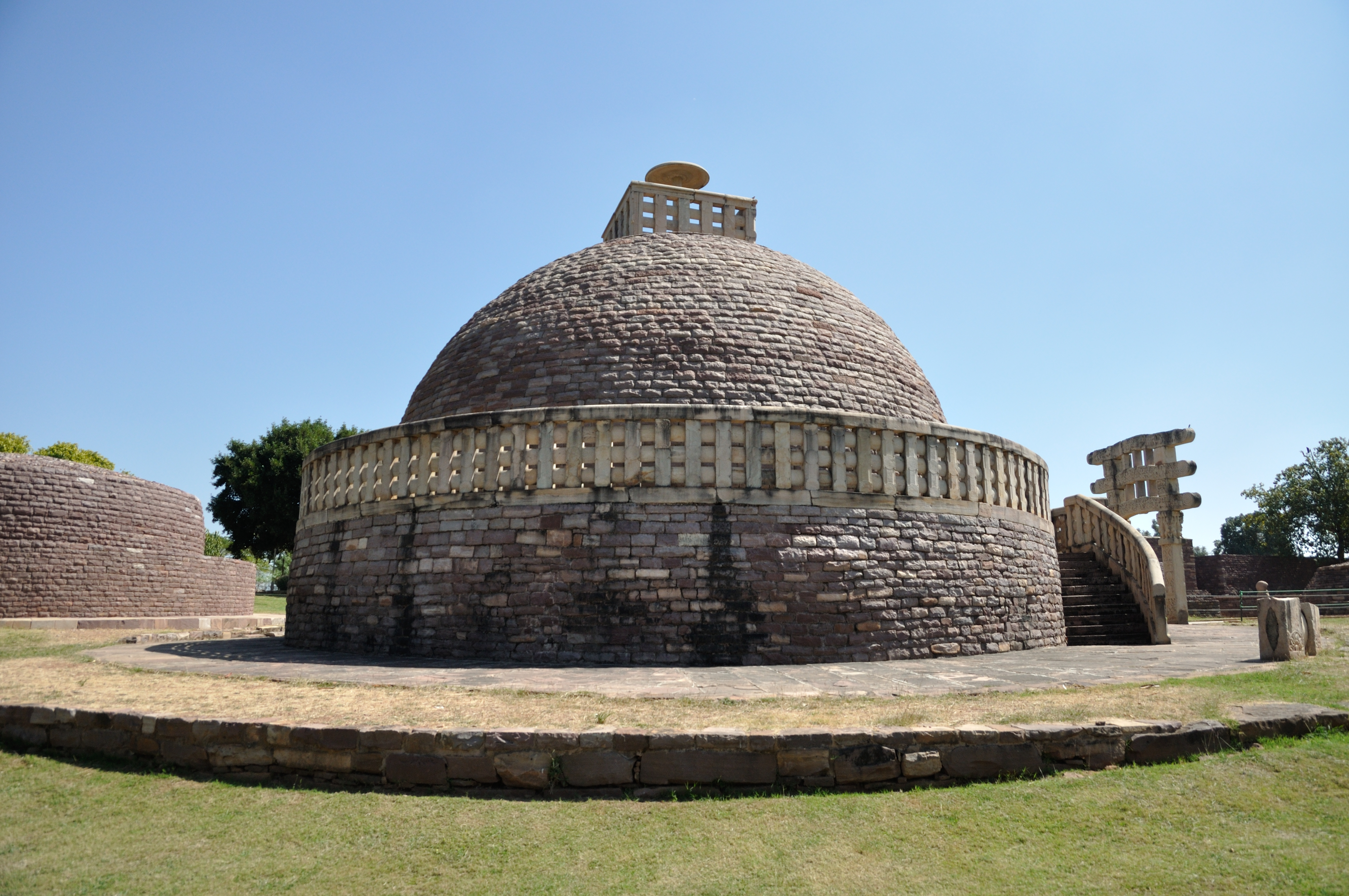
Sanchi stupa No 3, where the relics of Sariputta and Moggallana were first discovered

The relics of Sariputta and Moggallana refers to the cremated remains of the Buddhist disciples Sariputta (Sanskrit: Śāriputra; Pali: Sāriputta; Sinhala:Seriyuth සැරියුත්); and Moggallana (Sanskrit: Maudgalyāyana; Pali: Moggallāna;Sinhala: Mugalan මුගලන්). Sariputta and Moggallana (also called Maha Moggallana) were the two chief disciples of the Buddha, often stylized as the right hand and left hand disciples of the Buddha respectively. The two disciples were childhood friends who ordained under the Buddha together and are said to have become enlightened as arahants. The Buddha declared them his two chief disciples, after which they assumed leadership roles in the Buddha's ministry. Both of the chief disciples died a few months before the Buddha near the ancient Indian city of Rājagaha in what is now Bihar, and were cremated. According to Buddhist texts, the cremated remains of the disciples were then enshrined in stupas at notable monasteries of the time, with Sariputta's remains being enshrined at Jetavana monastery and Moggallana's remains being enshrined at Veḷuvana monastery. However, as of 1999 no modern archaeological reports have confirmed this, although in 1851 discoveries were made at other sites.

In 1851, British archaeologists Major Alexander Cunningham and Lieutenant Frederick Charles Maisey discovered relics attributed to the chief disciples during excavations of stupas in the Indian cities of Sanchi and Satdhara. Scholars have theorized that the relics were enshrined in stupas near Rajagaha after the disciples' deaths but were redistributed by later Indian kings such as King Asoka. Following the discovery, the Satdhara relics were sent to the Victoria and Albert Museum in London in 1866, while the Sanchi relics are said to have been lost when a ship carrying the remains sank. Following a Buddhist revival movement in South Asia in the late 19th century, Buddhist organizations including the Maha Bodhi Society began pressuring the British government to return the relics to Asia so they can be properly venerated, with the British government eventually conceding. The relics were sent to Sri Lanka in 1947, where they were on display at the Colombo Museum for nearly two years, and then were put on tour around parts of Asia starting in 1949. The relics were then divided up and permanently relocated in 1952, with portions being enshrined at the Kaba Aye Pagoda in Yangon, Burma, the Maha Bodhi Society temple in Colombo, Sri Lanka, and the Chethiyagiri Vihara in Sanchi, India.

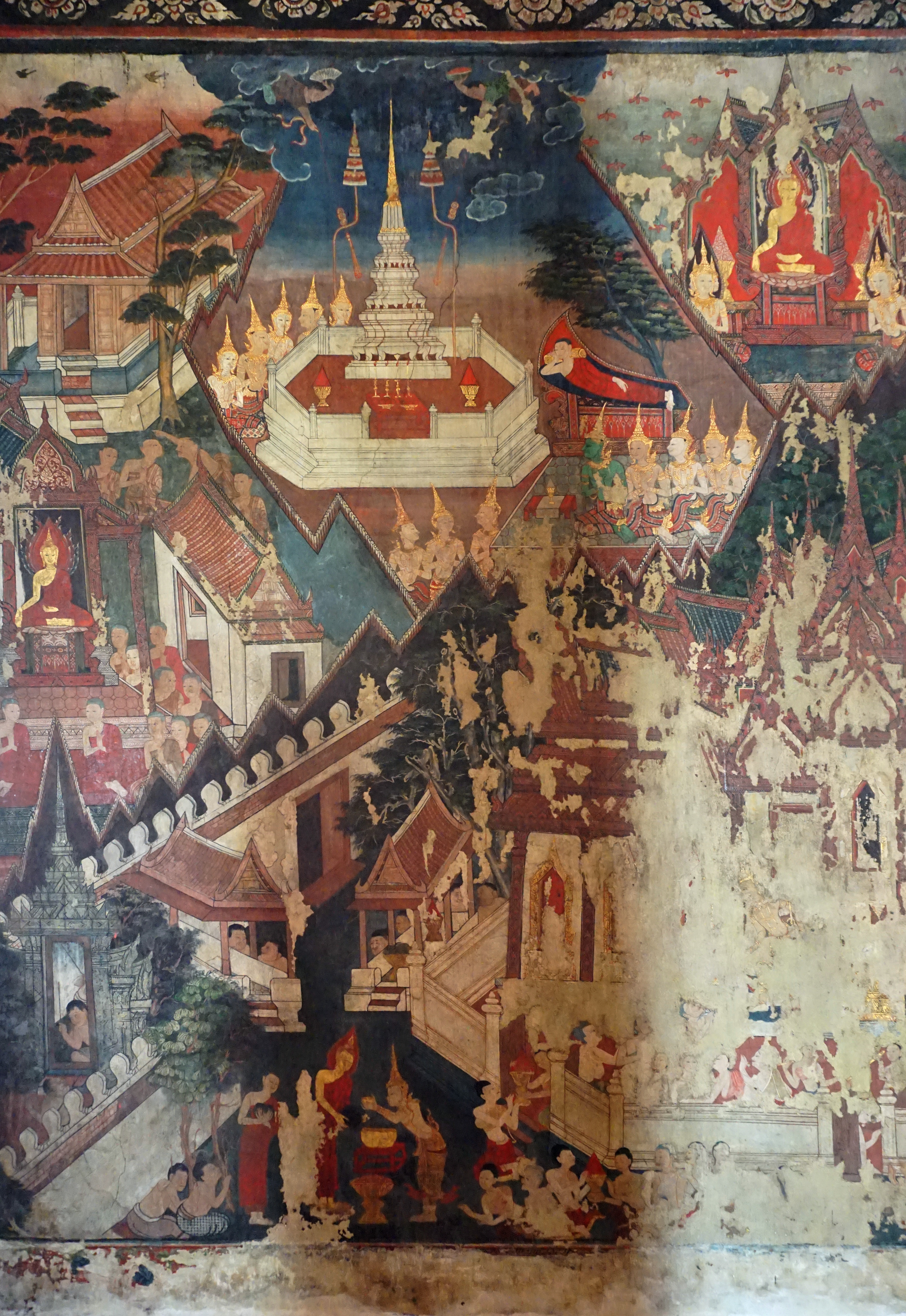
A Thai painting depicting the death of Sariputta

== Sariputta and Moggallana ==
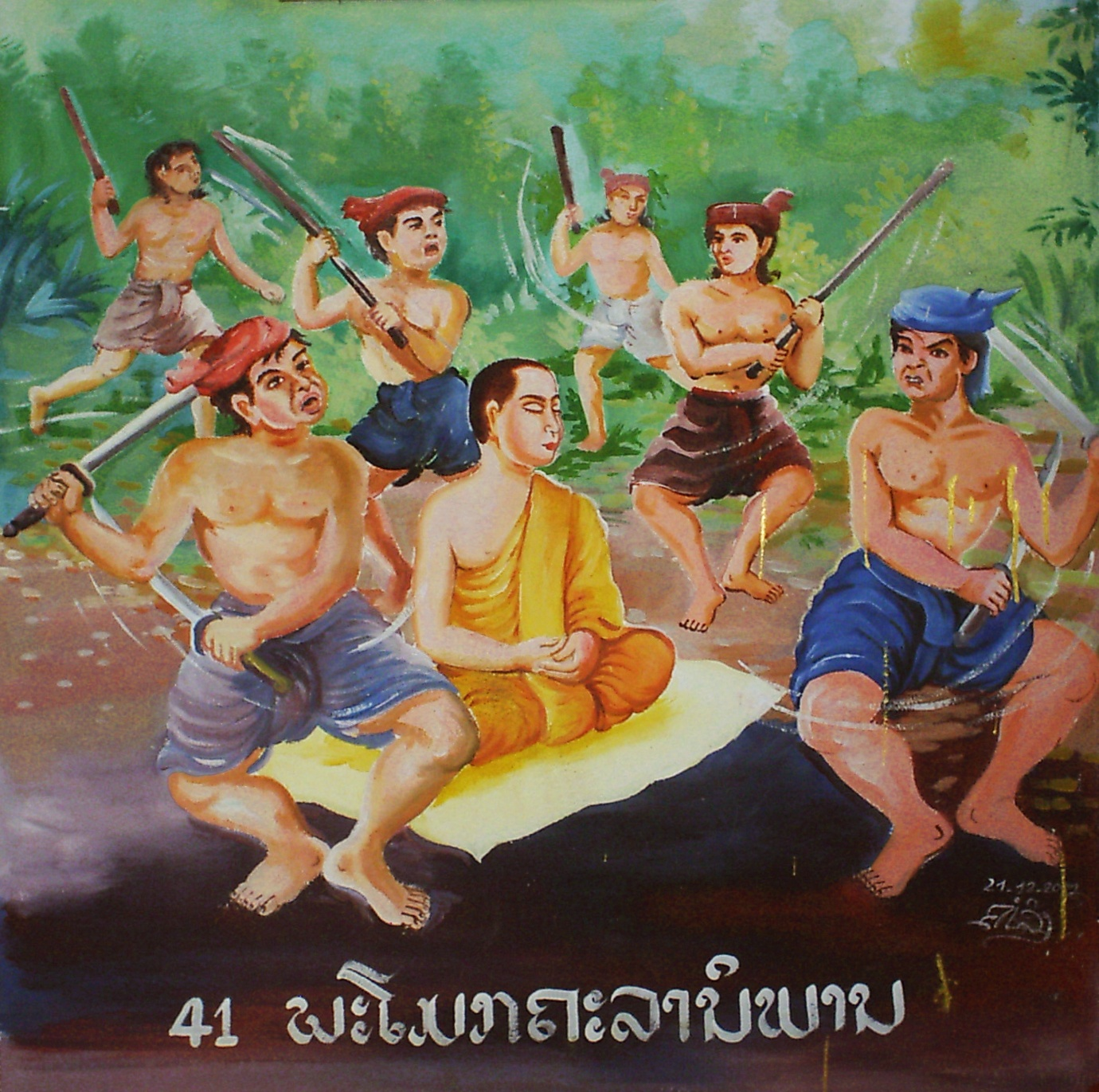
A depiction of Mahamoggallana's death

Sariputta and Moggallana were considered to have been the two chief disciples of the Buddha. Sariputta was considered the disciple who was foremost in wisdom and Moggallana was considered the disciple who was foremost in psychic powers. Buddhist texts relate that Sariputta and Moggallana were childhood friends who became spiritual wanderers in their youth. After having searched for spiritual truth under different contemporary masters, they came into contact with the teachings of the Buddha and ordained as monks under him, after which the Buddha declared the friends his two chief disciples, together described in the Mahāpadāna Sutta, as "the chief pair of disciples, the excellent pair" (Pali: sāvakayugaṁ aggaṁ bhaddayugaṁ). Texts describe that the two friends became arahants and played a key leadership role in the Buddha's ministry, including being tasked with the training of the Buddha's other disciples. Sariputta was considered the Buddha's right hand disciple, while Moggallana was considered his left hand disciple.

According to Buddhist texts, Sariputta and Moggallana both died a few months before the Buddha. Accounts of Sariputta's death state that he died peacefully in his hometown and was cremated in the city of Rājagaha. Sariputta's brother, Cunda, then brought his relics to the Buddha in Savatthi, where they were enshrined in a stupa at Jetavana monastery. Accounts of Moggallana's death state that he died violently, dying after being beaten by a group of bandits in a cave near Rājagaha. Buddhist texts state that Moggallana's relics were then collected and enshrined in the Veḷuvana monastery near Rājagaha. Over the succeeding centuries reports from Chinese pilgrims such as Xuanzang indicated that the relics could be found in the Indian city of Mathura in stupas built by Emperor Asoka.

== Excavation of the lost relics ==
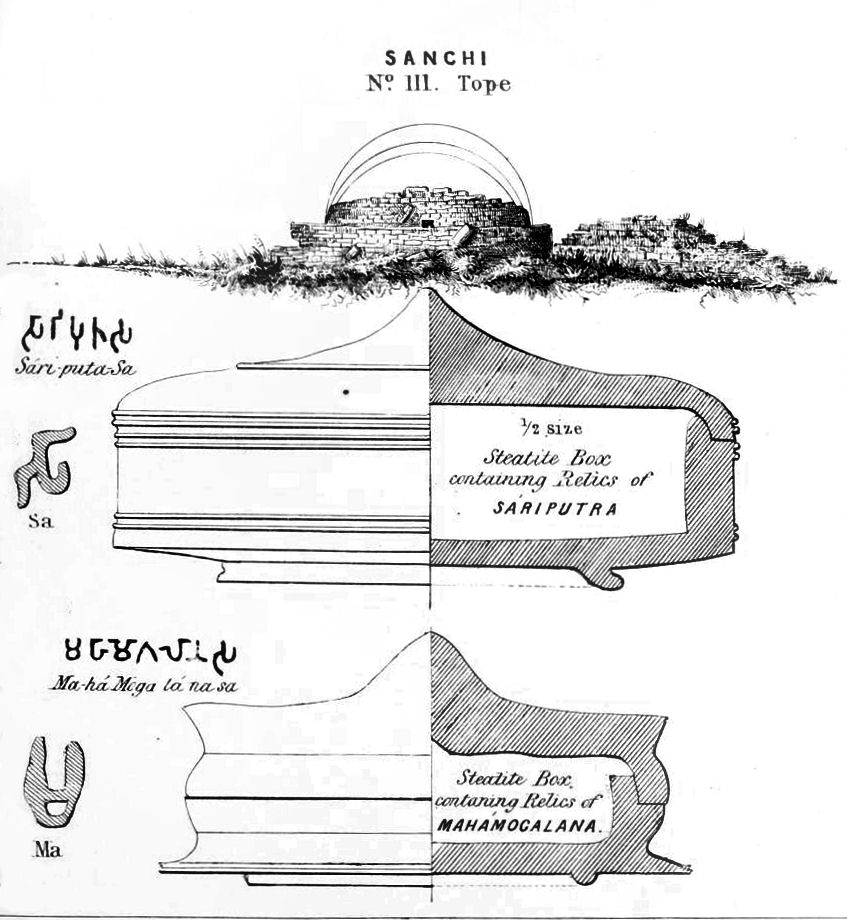
Sketch made by Cunningham of the relic caskets of Sariputta and Maha Moggallana found at Sanchi, Stupa No 3

As of 1999, no archaeological reports had confirmed findings of the relics of the chief disciples at the sites mentioned by either Chinese pilgrims or Buddhist texts. However, a 19th century British excavation did result in the discovery of relics attributed to the chief disciples in other locations.

=== Sanchi relics ===
In 1851, British archaeologists Major Cunningham and Lieutenant Maisey were exploring a site in Sanchi, near Bhopal, Madhya Pradesh in India, which was known for its many Buddhist stupas, also called "Topes", dating back to the 3rd century BCE. Attempts to excavate the stupas had been done in the past by Sir Thomas Herbert Maddock, who breached the outside of the stupas but was unable to reach the center. Cunningham and Maisey instead excavated the sites by going in perpendicular through the middle of the stupas, allowing them to successfully open and explore several stupas in Sanchi. During the expedition, Cunningham and Maisey excavated Stupa number 3 of the site and discovered an undisturbed chamber with two sandstone boxes. Each of the boxes contained a steatite casket containing human bone fragments. The lids of the boxes bore Brāhmī script, the southern box bore the inscription Sariputasa, meaning "(relics) of Sariputta", while the lid of the northern box bore the inscription Maha Mogalanasa meaning "(relics) of Maha Moggallana", identifying the bone fragments as belonging to the two chief disciples. The relative positioning of the boxes also had religious significance. Cunningham states that

Sariputra and Mahamoggallana were the principal followers of the Buddha, and were usually styled his right and left hand disciples. Their ashes thus preserved after death the same positions to the right and left of Buddha which they had themselves occupied in life.

— Alexander Cunningham, The Bhilsa Topes

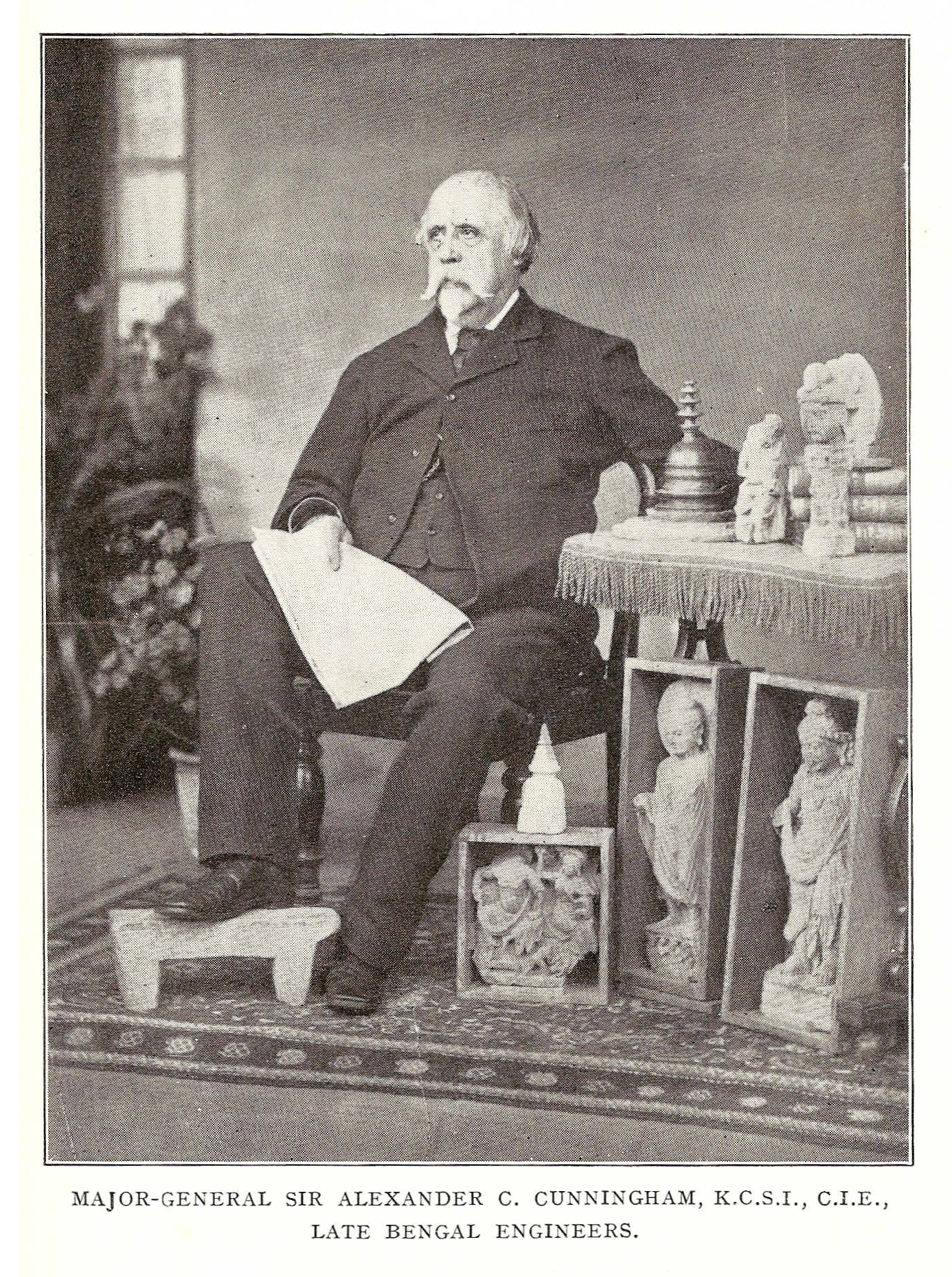
Alexander Cunningham, one of the archaeologists who made the discovery of the relics of the chief disciples

According to Cunningham, people in ancient India sat facing the east during religious ceremonies and even used the word east (para) for "front", as well as the word south (dakshina) for "right" and the word north (vami) for "left", meaning the positioning of Sariputta's casket toward the south and Moggallana's casket toward the north symbolized each disciple's relative positions as right and left hand disciple respectively. This positioning has also been explained by the fact that the Buddha traditionally sat facing the east, which would make the south his right hand side, and the north his left hand side.

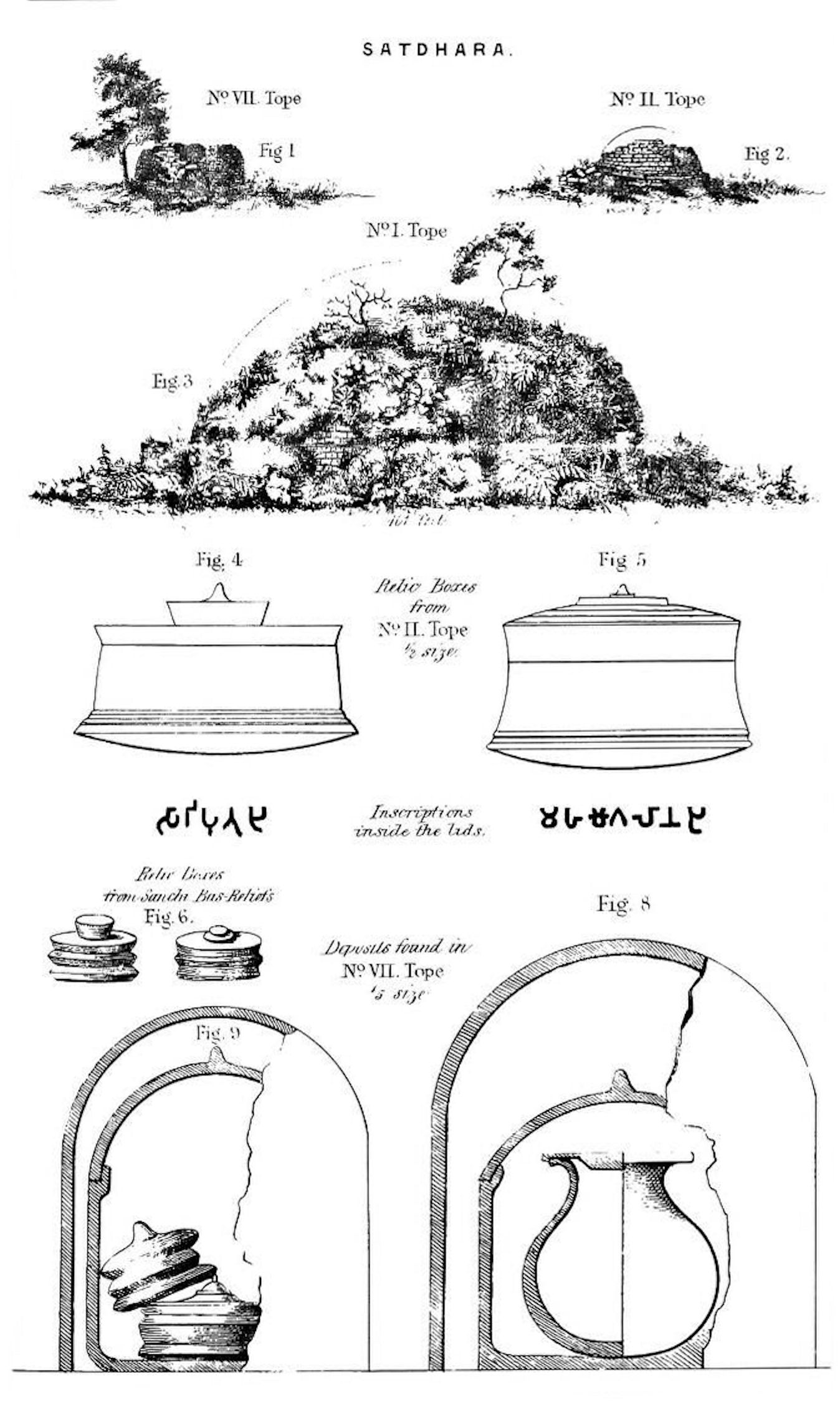
Sketch made by Cunningham of the Satdhara stupas and the inscribed caskets of Sariputta and Moggallana

The box attributed to Sariputta contained a round white steatite casket, more than six inches in diameter and three inches in height. The surface was polished and hard, and the box is believed to have been turned on a lathe. Surrounding the casket were two pieces of sandalwood, which Cunningham believed was from Sariputta's funeral pyre. Inside the casket was one single bone fragment nearly one inch long, and seven beads made up of precious stones and metals. The box attributed to Moggallana contained a slightly smaller steatite casket made up of a slightly softer substance. Inside the casket were two bone fragments, the larger one being nearly half an inch long. Each of the caskets had an ink Brāhmī character inscribed on the inner surface of the lid: the Brāhmī character "Sa" (𑀲𑀸) on the casket attributed to Sariputta and the Brāhmī character "Ma" (𑀫) on the casket attributed to Mahamoggallana. According to Cunningham, the ink inscriptions were possibly the oldest ink writings in existence.

=== Satdhara relics ===
Following the discovery in Sanchi, Cunningham and Maisey excavated several nearby sites. During an excavation at the city of Satdhara a few miles west, the archaeologists found another pair of steatite relic caskets at Satdhara's Stupa Number 2, one of a group that was locally called the "Buddha Bhita" or "Buddha Monuments". The caskets were smaller than the Sanchi ones, about three inches in diameter and two inches in height, and each contained several human bone fragments. According to Cunningham, there was evidence that the stupa had been opened before and concluded that villagers had opened it and then closed it up after finding nothing but bone fragments. Inside the lids of the caskets were inscriptions like those in Sanchi, Sariputasa meaning "(relics) of Sariputta" and Maha Mogalanasa meaning "(relics) of Maha Moggallana". The only notable difference between these inscriptions and the ones in Sanchi was the positioning of a Brāhmī vowel, which Cunningham believed was due either to the inscription being done by a different engraver or being done at a different time period.

Cunningham theorized that the relics were enshrined in stupas near Rajagaha after the disciples' deaths until the time of Emperor Asoka, who then redistributed them in stupas throughout India. Scholars have also theorized that a Sunga king may have also done a similar redistribution and built stupas such as the one in Sanchi to enshrine them. Cunningham and Maisey spent several months excavating numerous stupas in the area, but they didn't make any more finds as significant as the findings in Sanchi and Satdhara.

== Display in Britain ==
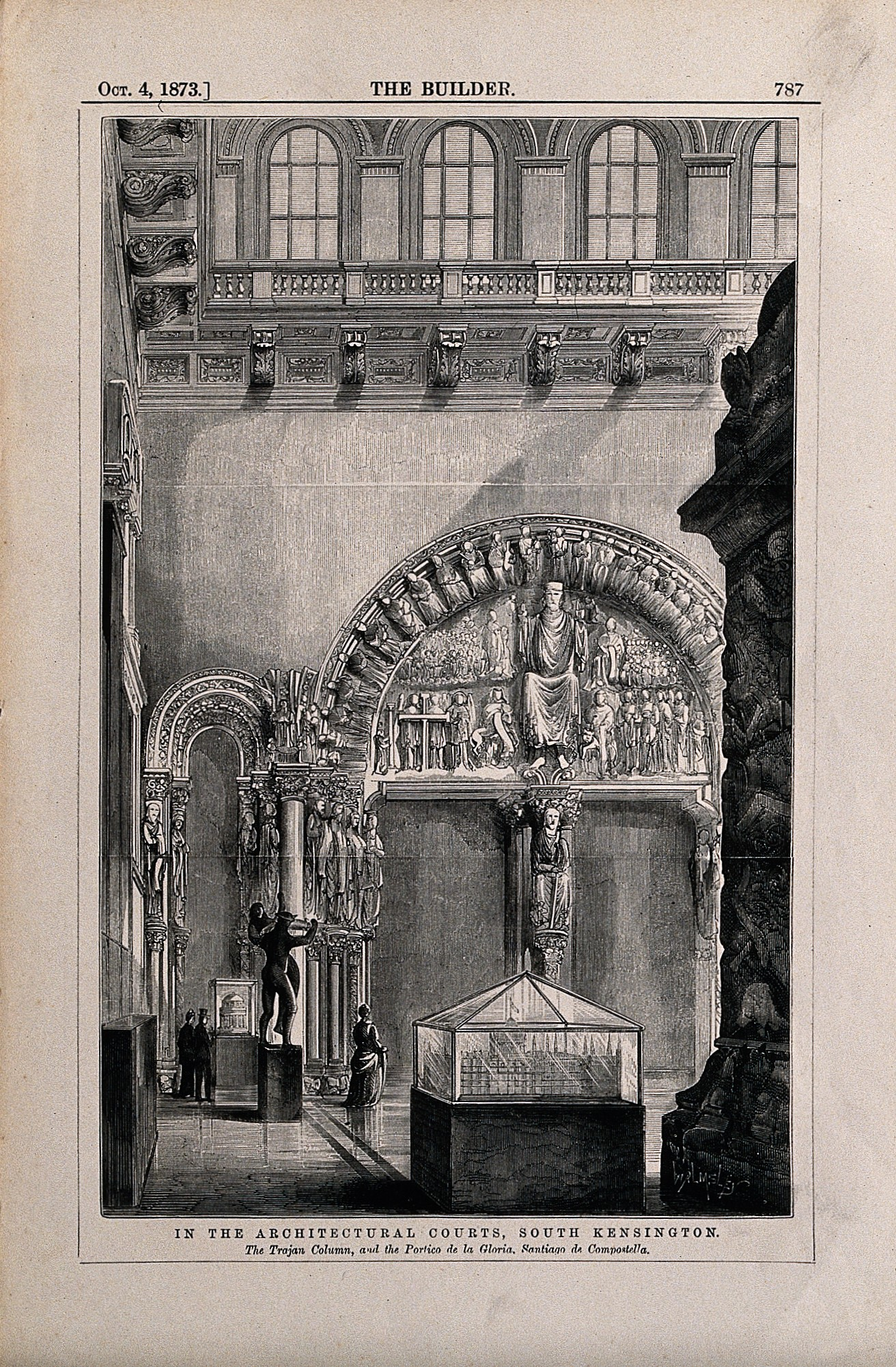
Depiction of the Victoria & Albert Museum in 1873, then called the South Kensington Museum

Cunningham and Maisey later divided their findings among each other, with Maisey bringing the Satdhāra relics to Britain and loaning them to the Victoria and Albert Museum (then called the South Kensington Museum) in London in 1866 along with several other artifacts from Asia. The relics were eventually purchased by the Museum in 1921 from Maisley's son, whose ownership devolved. Cunningham brought his findings to Britain on two ships, one of which sank, thus the Sanchi relics are assumed to have been lost. Scholar of religion Torkel Brekke, however, argues that Maisey took all the relics with him, and thus the Sanchi relics went to Britain along with the Satdhāra ones. Archeologist Louis Finot notes that Cunningham had no interest in the relics, only in the caskets.

In the late 19th century, a Buddhist revival movement led by the Maha Bodhi Society began taking place in South Asia. The revival efforts led several Buddhist organizations to begin pressuring the British government starting in the 1920s to return the relics of the chief disciples to India, where they can be properly venerated. The Victoria and Albert Museum rejected the initial requests, which at first came as a series of letters from local English Buddhists. On one occasion, the museum instead offered to allow a small group of local Buddhists to worship the relics at the museum, in response to a request that the relics temporarily be sent to a local Buddhist center for a worship. The museum argued that it also held Christian relics, and that returning the Buddhist relics would result in many museums being forced to return other relics as well.

The situation changed in 1939 however, when the museum was informed that the government of India had forwarded a request for the return of the relics on behalf of Buddhist organizations. While museum director Eric Maclagan still argued that doing so would result in being forced to also return their Christian relics, one museum official argued that Britain being a Christian country gives them rights to those relics that they do not have with Buddhist relics. The museum was eventually instructed by the British government to return the relics for diplomatic reasons later that year. However, the transfer was delayed due to the outbreak of World War II, due to fear of the relics being lost in wartime transport. After the war ended, the transfer was officially made in 1947 with the relics first being transported to predominantly Buddhist Sri Lanka in accordance with an agreement made with Buddhist organizations.

== Tour of Asia ==
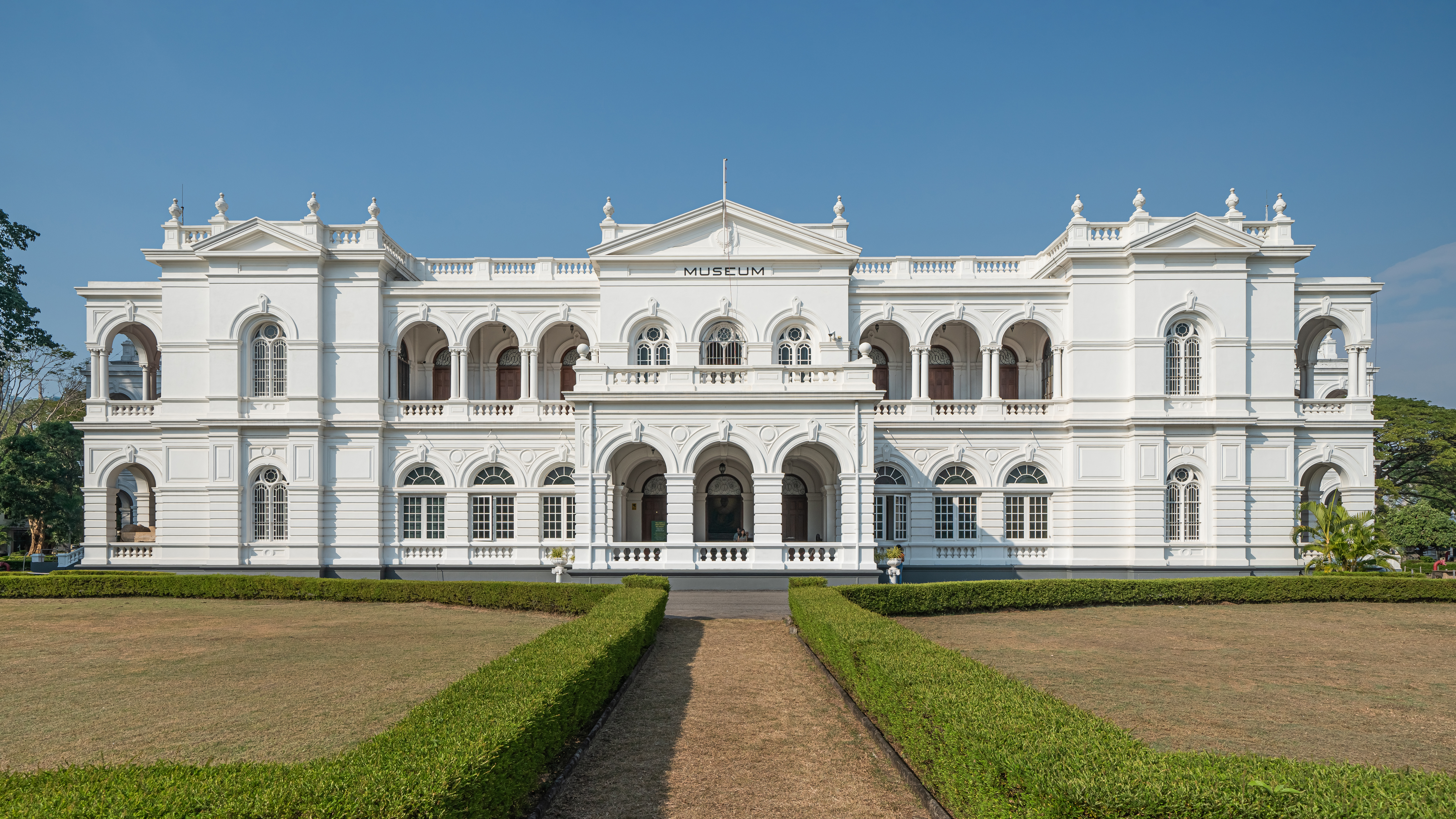
The National Museum of Colombo (then called the Colombo Museum), where the relics resided for nearly two years after being returned by the British

Following the transfer of the relics from the British, they were put on display at the Colombo Museum (now called the National Museum of Colombo) in Sri Lanka, where they were visited by an estimated two million people across different faiths. The Victoria and Albert Museum originally transferred the relics in plaster casket copies, but after the High Commissioner of India made a request for the original caskets in 1948 the museum transferred the original caskets to Sri Lanka as well. The relics remained in Sri Lanka for nearly two years before being transported to Calcutta, India in 1949, where they were formally received by Indian Prime Minister Jawaharlal Nehru and officially handed over to the Maha Bodhi Society of India. They were housed at the Dharmarajika Vihara, the headquarters of the Society, for two weeks where they received a constant stream of visitors, many of which Hindu and Muslim. The relics were then put on tour around northern India.

In 1950 the relics were sent to Burma for a two month visit. The relics were received in the Burmese city of Rangoon, coinciding with the arrival of other Buddhist relics from Sri Lanka. According to reports of the occasion, most of the city had turned out for the arrival of the relics and the relics received a constant stream of visiting devotees for the month that they were in the city. In the second month of the visit, the relics were put on tour around Burma in a river tour that drew large crowds at the stops, including people from neighboring villages. One thing that was well reported in Burmese news was the visitation of the relics to areas of ethnic minorities, where they were also enthusiastically received. The relics were also taken for exposition in Nepal, Tibet and Cambodia.

== Re-enshrinement ==
=== Burma ===
Following the tour of the relics in Burma in 1950, Burmese Prime Minister U Nu asked India for a portion of the relics for Burma to keep permanently. Later that year, Indian Prime Minister Jawaharlal Nehru agreed to make a "permanent loan" of a portion of the relics to Burma in what was seen as a gesture of goodwill toward its newly independent neighbor. Burma's portion of the relics arrived from Calcutta in 1951, on the same day as some relics from the Buddha himself. Like the first visit, they were received by a large crowd and were put on tour around the Burma. The relics were then housed in a shrine near Botatuang Pagoda, which was destroyed in World War II and was being reconstructed. Although the Burmese government originally intended to house the relics at the Botatuang Pagoda after reconstruction, following the completion of the Kaba Aye Pagoda in 1952, Prime Minister U Nu decided to permanently house them at the Kaba Aye Pagoda in Yangon instead.

=== Sri Lanka ===
Sri Lanka also obtained a portion of the relics, which were brought from Sanchi in 1952 and kept at the temple of the Maha Bodhi Society in Colombo. The relics are exhibited annually during the local celebration of the Buddha's birthday, Vesak Day. In 2015, the Maha Bodhi Society broke with tradition by showing the relics to Pope Francis outside of the duration of the annual festival. Responding to critics, the head of the society, Banagala Upatissa Thero, stated that no pope had set foot inside a Buddhist temple since 1984, and added that "religious leaders have to play a positive role to unite [their] communities instead of dividing".

=== India ===
The portion of the relics that stayed in India were also enshrined in 1952, at the Chethiyagiri Vihara in Sanchi, which was built by the Maha Bodhi Society specifically to house the relics. The vihara was funded in part by a donation from the Nawab of Bhopal as well as a land grant from the local Bhopal government. The relics are shown every year at the annual international Buddhist festival in November. In 2016, the exhibition was visited by Thai princess Sirindhorn.

=== United States ===
Another portion of the relics of Sariputta and Maha Moggallana was donated, by the Maha Bodhi Society, to the Insight Meditation Society in Barre, MA, and placed on display there in 2008. A year later, a portion of the relic of Sariputta was moved to the nearby Barre Center for Buddhist Studies, and placed within the newly constructed stone stupa on that campus.

Relic locations

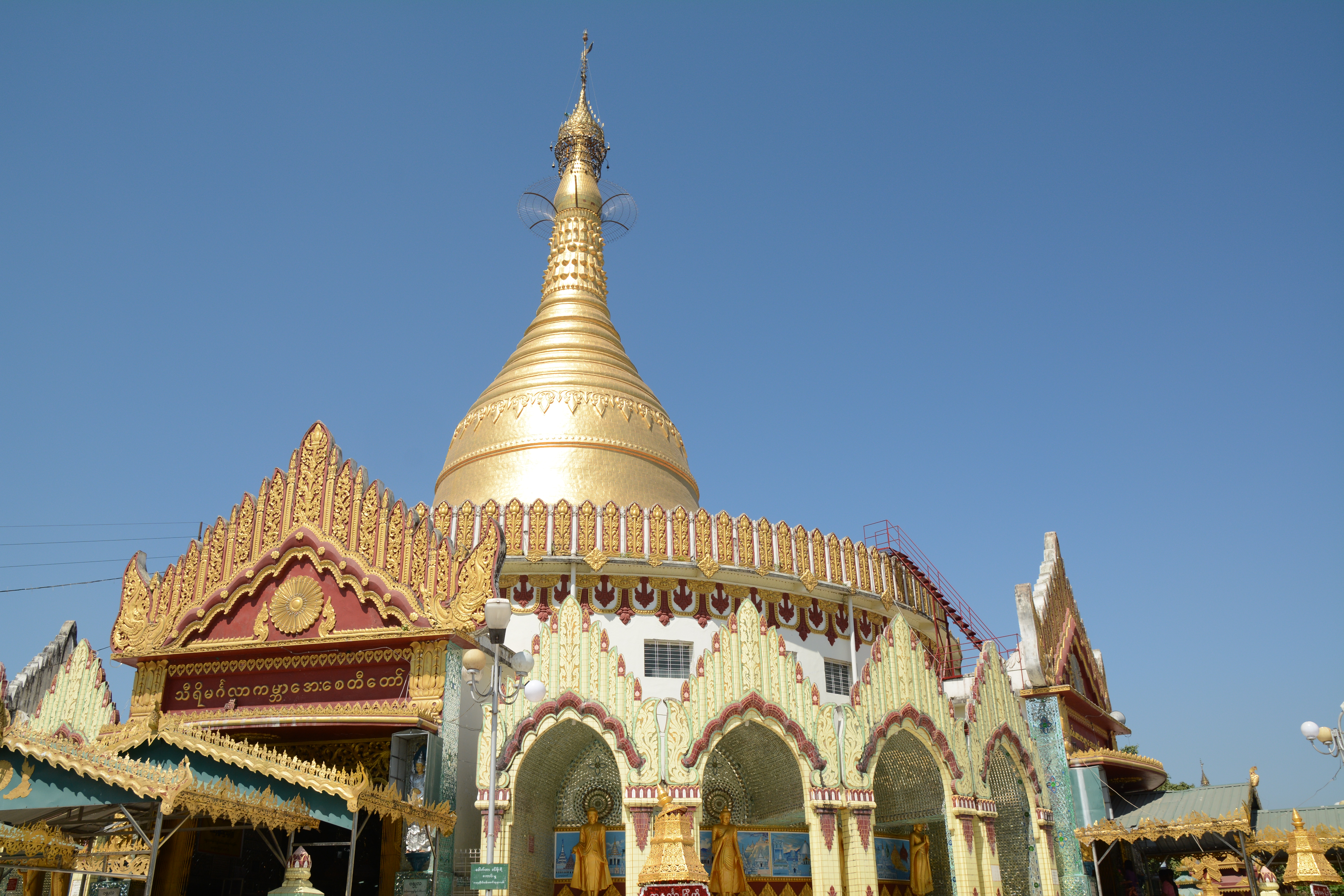
The Kaba Aye Pagoda, where Burma's portion of the relics are enshrined.

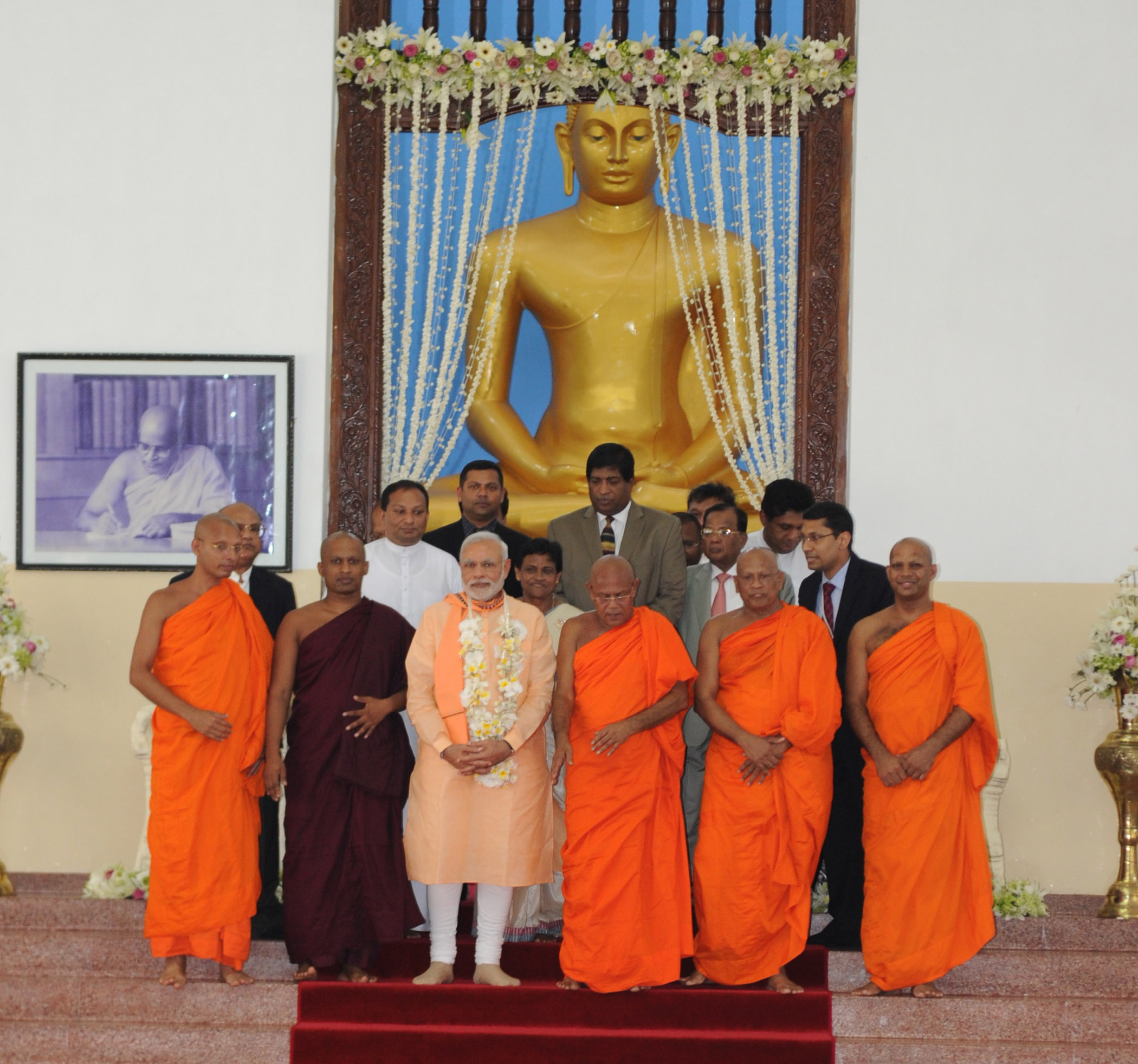
The Mahabodhi Society, in Colombo, where Sri Lanka's portion of the relics are enshrined.

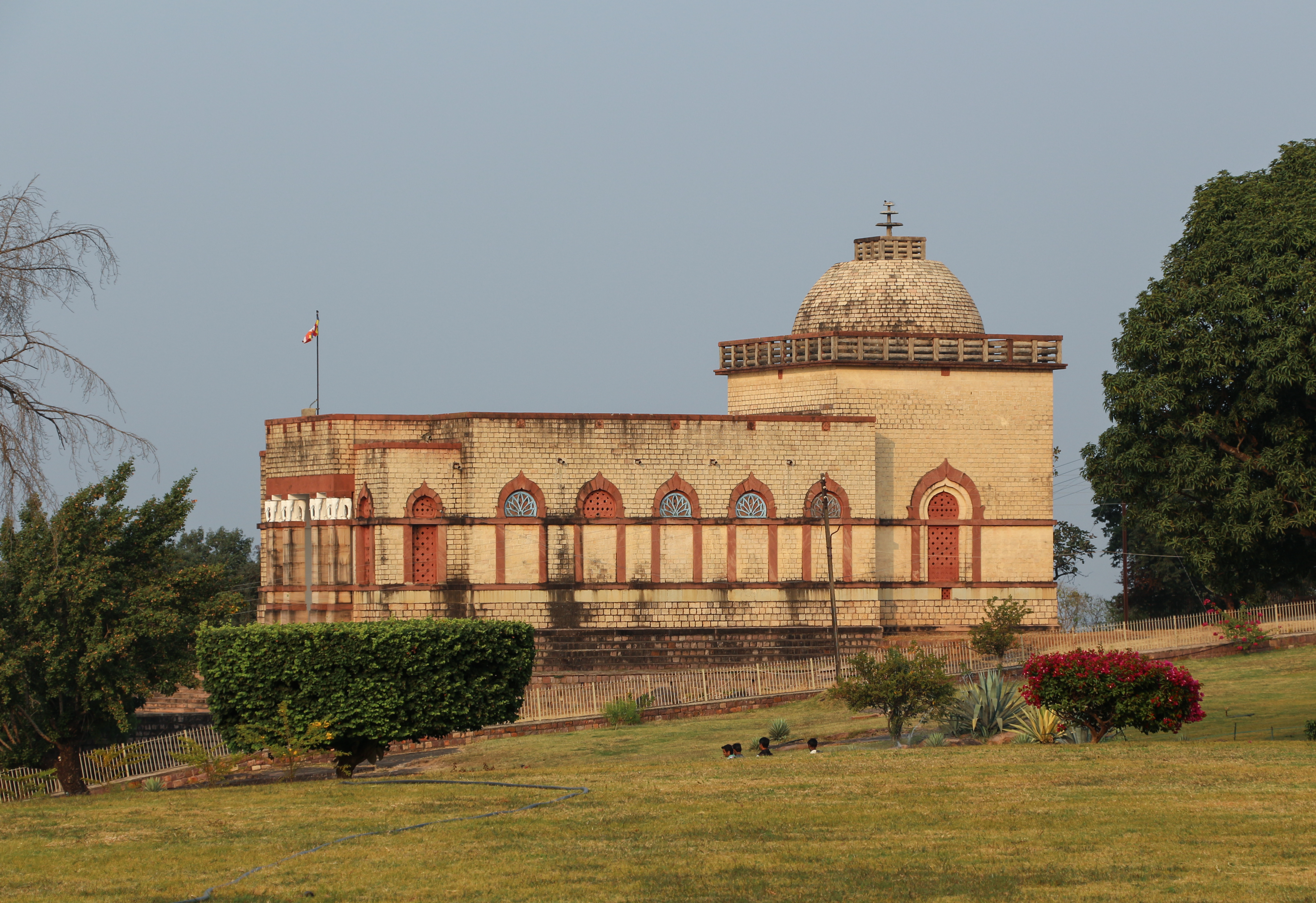
The Chethiyagiri Vihara in Sanchi, where India's portion of the relics are enshrined.

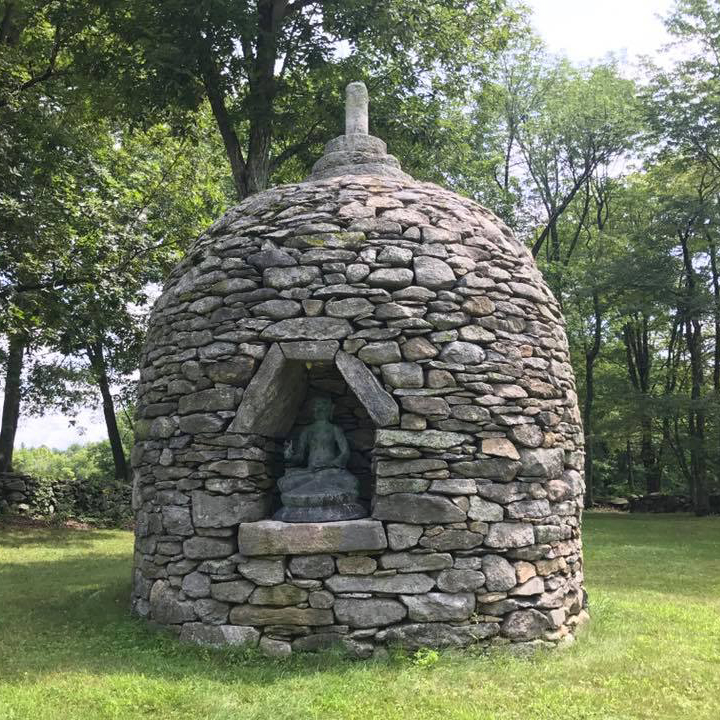
Stone Stupa at Barre Center for Buddhist Studies

== Legacy ==
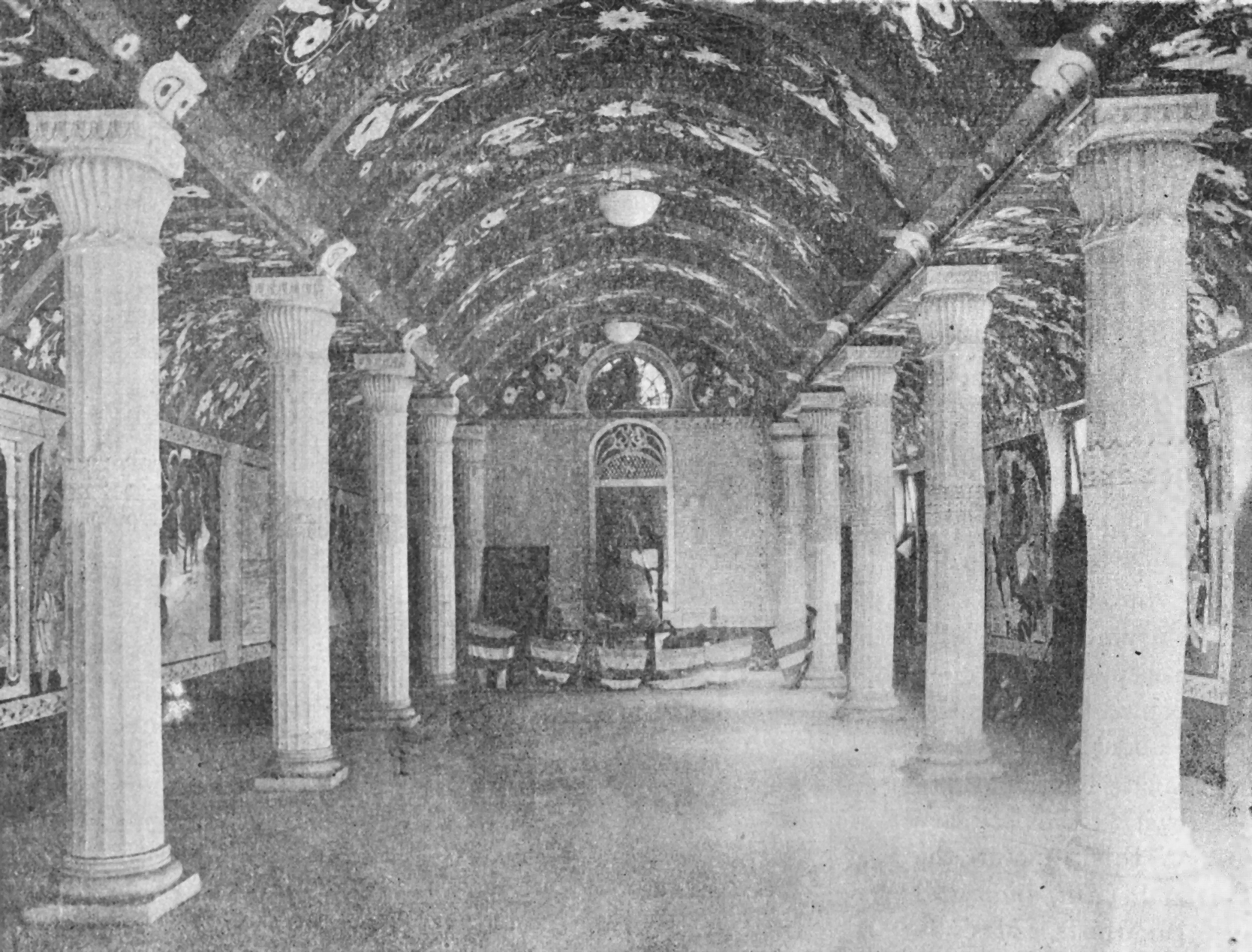
Interior of the Dharmarajika Chetiya Vihara of the Maha Bodhi Society, where the relics were first stored upon their return to India. The return of the relics was considered one of the Society's greatest accomplishments.

Brekke calls the return of the relics of Sariputta and Moggallana to Asia the greatest achievement and "the most significant historical point of reference" of the Maha Bodhi Society of India, matched only by the role the society played in the return of relics of the Buddha himself. The relics were received in India in a massive ceremony and their retrieval was highly celebrated. According to Brekke, Indian Prime Minister Nehru saw Buddhism as a peaceful and unifying force for India and the relics of the chief disciples were seen as a symbol of the newly independent country's values of religious tolerance and non-violence. In various speeches made at the receiving ceremony for the relics, speakers made comparisons between Indian independence leader Mahatma Gandhi and the Buddha.

According to art historian Jack Daulton, the visit of the relics to Burma played a significant political role in Burma as well. The newly independent Burmese state promoted a revival of Buddhism in the country, which at the time was dealing with widespread civil strife. The relics helped establish the new Burmese government's legitimacy and had a unifying effect on the country. After the relics visited Burma, Burmese Prime Minister U Nu stated that "at every place where the relics have been exhibited, most of all in the neighborhoods of disturbed areas, public morale greatly improved."

Daulton describes the story of the relics and their influence on various governments as "amazing" given that they were just tiny bone fragments, stating that: "those tiny pieces of bone moved not only millions of devotees worldwide, but national governments as well". Brekke argues that the story of the relics showed a dynamic between archaeology and politics. In the view of curators at the Victoria and Albert Museum, as well as that of Maisey and Cunningham, the relics of Sariputta and Moggallana had only artistic and historical value, and in that world there was "no place for the religious use of relics", states Brekke. However, in the places where the relics were ultimately enshrined, the significance of the relics was almost entirely religious. In Burma, the enshrinement of the Burmese portion of the relics was met with devotees dropping to their knees in veneration as the relics passed by. In Sri Lanka, the Sri Lankan portion of the relics are customarily only taken out for public display and veneration on the Buddha's birthday, Vesak Day, while in India, a fair is held annually at the vihara that houses the Sanchi portion of the relics that is attended by Buddhists all over the world.

== Sources ==
- Ainsworth, William Harrison (1854), Ainsworth's Magazine: A Miscellany of Romance, General Literature, & Art, Chapman and Hall
- Brekke, Torkel (1 January 2007), "Bones of Contention: Buddhist Relics, Nationalism and the Politics of Archaeology", Numen, 54 (3): 270–303, doi:10.1163/156852707X211564, ISSN 1568-5276, archived from the original on 29 March 2020
- Buswell, Robert E. Jr.; Lopez, Donald S. Jr. (2013), Princeton Dictionary of Buddhism. (PDF), Princeton, NJ: Princeton University Press, ISBN 978-0-691-15786-3, archived (PDF) from the original on 12 June 2018
- Cunningham, Alexander (1854), The Bhilsa Topes, Or, Buddhist Monuments of Central India: A Brief Historical Sketch of the Rise, Progress, and Decline of Buddhism, Etc..., Smith
- Daulton, J. (1999), "Sariputta and Moggallana in the Golden Land: The Relics of the Buddha's Chief Disciples at the Kaba Aye Pagoda" (PDF), Journal of Burma Studies, 4 (1): 101–128, doi:10.1353/jbs.1999.0002, S2CID 161183926, archived (PDF) from the original on 29 December 2019
- Hecker, Hellmuth; Nyanaponika Thera (2003), Great Disciples of the Buddha: Their Lives, Their Works, Their Legacy (PDF), Simon and Schuster, ISBN 978-0-86171-381-3, archived from the original (PDF) on 5 November 2020
- Higham, Charles (2004), Encyclopedia of ancient Asian civilizations, New York: Facts On File, ISBN 0-8160-4640-9, OCLC 51978070
- Le, Huu Phuoc (2010), Buddhist Architecture, Grafikol, ISBN 978-0-9844043-0-8, archived from the original on 6 May 2022
- Maha Thera Tripitakavagisvaracarya, Walpola Sri Rahula (1892), The Maha Bodhi, Maha-Bodhi Society.
- Malalasekera, G.P. (1937a), Dictionary of Pāli proper names (Sariputta), vol. 2 (1st Indian ed.), Delhi: Motilal Banarsidass Publishers, ISBN 81-208-3022-9, archived from the original on 5 August 2013
- Malalasekera, G.P. (1937b), Dictionary of Pāli proper names (Maha Moggallana Thera), vol. 2 (1st Indian ed.), Delhi: Motilal Banarsidass Publishers, ISBN 81-208-3022-9, archived from the original on 6 May 2021
- Rhys Davids, T.W. (1908), "Moggallāna", in Hastings, James; Selbie, John Alexander; Gray, Louis H. (eds.), Encyclopaedia of religion and ethics, vol. 8, Edinburgh: T. & T. Clark
- Silk, Jonathan A. (2019), Brill's encyclopedia of Buddhism Vol Two, von Hinüber, Oskar; Eltschinger, Vincent; Bowring, Richard; Radich, Michael, Leiden, ISBN 978-90-04-29937-5, OCLC 909251257
