= Sri Lanka Maha Bodhi Centre, Chennai =

Buddhist temple in Chennai, India

Sri Lanka Maha Bodhi Centre
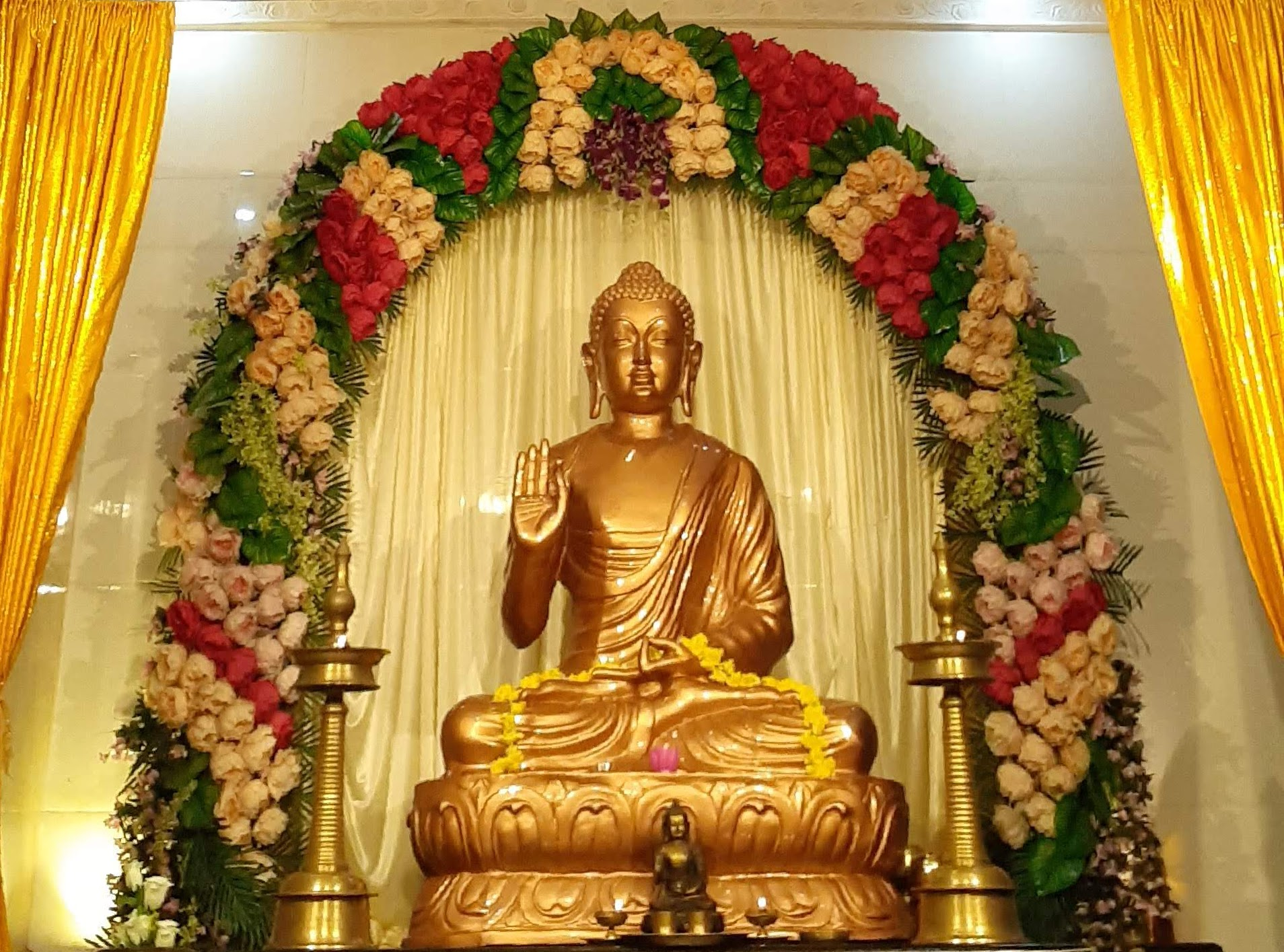
- Statue of the Buddha within the temple

Religion
- Affiliation: Sri Lanka Maha Bodhi Society
- District: Chennai
- Region: Egmore
- Status: Functional

Location
- Location: Chennai, India
- State: Tamil Nadu

The Sri Lanka Maha Bodhi Centre is a Sri Lankan Buddhist establishment in Chennai, India. It is located in Egmore. It is run by the Sri Lanka Maha Bodhi Society and serves as a monument of friendship between Sri Lanka and India. The current President of the Sri Lanka Maha Bodhi Society is Banagala Upatissa Thero.

== The Maha Bodhi Society of India ==
The headquarters of the Maha Bodhi Society is located at Colombo. The Maha Bodhi Society of India was founded by Anagarika Dharmapala in May 1891 under the objective of restoring the ancient Buddhist shrines at places such as Gaya and Sarnath. He founded the Society's first center at Bodh Gaya and in various other cities, including the one at Chennai, with the objective of providing shelter, assistance and guidance to the devotees who visit Buddha Gaya annually. The Chennai centre was established with the money borrowed from Sir Kent, in favour of the Maha Bodhi Society—Sri Lanka.

== The Buddha temple ==
Sri Lanka Maha Bodhi Centre is located at Kenneth lane opposite to Egmore Railway Station. A small temple of Buddha, named Buddha Vihar, is situated inside the building of the Maha Bodhi Society of India. It is one of the important Buddhist temples in Chennai. The temple has an 18-ft life-size statue of Lord Buddha in a standing posture (Abhya Mudra) in the main hall. The festival of "Vesak" is celebrated annually in the month of May and cultural programmes are held at the centre. The centre also has a free homeopathic clinic started by the then director of the Chennai Centre, Ven. Ellawala Nandisvara Nayaka Thera, who is also instrumental in building the temple.

On 14 May 2011, Maha Bodhi Nikethanaya, a lodging facility for Buddhist pilgrims from Sri Lanka, was inaugurated in the centre, as part of 2,600th Sri Sambuddhatva Jayanthi celebrations by the Sri Lanka Deputy High Commission in Chennai, which commemorates Buddha's enlightenment. The five-storeyed building was constructed at a cost of ₹ 65 million. The building has 32 rooms.

The centre is venerated as a popular temple of "Theravada" worship that is visited by about 120,000 to 150,000 people annually.

== Attacks ==
In 1983, at the peak of the ethnic strife in Sri Lanka, a bomb was thrown into the premises by unknown persons.

On 24 January 2011, the centre was attacked by an unidentified group of about 10 to 15 persons at around 9:00 p.m. local time. It was thought to be retaliation against the alleged killing of two Indian fishermen by the Sri Lankan Navy off the Tamil Nadu coast in the past two weeks.

== See also ==
- Deputy High Commission of Sri Lanka, Chennai
- Theravāda Buddhism
- Mahabodhi Temple
- Buddhist pilgrimage
