= Attacks on Sri Lankans in Tamil Nadu =

Military attack in India

Attacks on Sri Lankans in Tamil Nadu refer to a series of attacks and demonstrations that have taken place in the Indian state of Tamil Nadu against Sri Lankans (particularly Sinhalese) and Sri Lankan interests in the state. The protests took several forms, of attacks on individuals, groups and institutions.

These attacks have led to the Sri Lankan government considering to shift its Deputy High Commissioner's office in Chennai, the capital of Tamil Nadu, to Trivandrum, the capital of Kerala following its recall of its Defence Attaché from Chennai as a result of harassment. Sri Lankan students in universities in Tamil Nadu have been forced to vacate college hostels and are refused alternate accommodation in private homes.

== List of incidences ==
- March 2008: Sri Lankan director Thushara Peiris was assaulted while working on a film in Chennai.
- September 2011: The Maha Bodhi Society office in Chennai was vandalized by the Naam Thamizhar group.
- 10 January 2012: Sri Lankan President Mahinda Rajapakse's brother-in-law Thirukumuran Nadesan was attacked by MDMK activists while coming out of a temple in Rameshwaram.
- September 2012: 184 Sri Lankan pilgrims to churches in Velankanni and Poondi were attacked by pro-Eelam groups and had to be evacuated by a special flight of Mihin Lanka.
- 7 February 2013: Bank of Ceylon Branch in Chennai was attacked by a mob of 15 people.
- March 2013: Mihin Lanka sales office in Madurai attack by Pro-Tamil Naam Thamizhar group.
- 16 March 2013: A Sri Lankan Buddhist priest, a student of The Archaeological Survey of India (ASI), was attacked by a group of Tamil political activists while visiting The Thanjavur temple complex. Later Three buses carrying the priest and the rest of the students to the Tiruchirapalli airport attacked by Tamil outfits.
- 18 March 2013:A group of men attacked a Sri Lankan Buddhist monk on a pilgrimage at Chennai Central railway station.

== Reaction of the Government of Sri Lanka ==
- On 3 September 2012: Ministry of External Affairs, issued a travel advisory to abstain from visiting to Tamil Nadu considering the "increasing instances of intimidation of Sri Lankans visiting Tamil Nadu for tourism, pilgrimages, sporting and cultural activities and professional training" and later lifted on 9 October 2012.
- On 19 March 2013: Issuing a statement, Government of Sri Lanka expressed its regrets over violent assaults against Sri Lankan nationals and lodged strong protests with the Government of India through its High Commission in New Delhi and the Deputy High Commission in Chennai. Ministry of external affairs reissued the travel advisory.

== Reaction of the Government of India ==
- On 19 March 2013: Indian High Commission in Colombo, issuing a statement, expressed that Indian Government has "noted with concern the recent incidents involving Sri Lankan citizens in Tamil Nadu" and assured the safety, security and well-being of Sri Lankan visitors to India.

== See also ==
- 2013 Anti-Sri Lanka protests
- Sri Lankan Tamil diaspora
- Sri Lankan Civil War
- Liberation Tigers of Tamil Eelam
