= Acharya Buddharakkhita =

Indian Buddhist monk and writer

Acharya Buddharakkhita आचार्य बुद्धरक्खित
- Acharya Buddharakkhita
- Born: 12 March 1922; Manipur, Imphal, India
- Died: 23 September 2013 (aged 91); Bangalore, India
- Education: Institute of Engineering Technology, Calcutta
- Writing career
- Notable work: English translation of Dhammapada
- Notable awards: Abhidhaja Aggamaha Saddhammajotika
- Website: mahabodhi.info/about_us.html

Acharya Buddharakkhita (Pali: बुद्धरक्खित; 1922–2013) was an Indian Buddhist monk and prolific writer who established the Maha Bodhi Society of Beṅgaḷūru. It is affiliated with the Maha Bodhi Society of Kolkātā founded by Anagarika Dharmapala, with both organisations functioning independently of each other.

He was born in Imphal, Manipur, in 1922. His parents were Vishnupada and Sailavaladevi Bandopadhyaya. 1942, he took part in the Quit India Movement.

He joined the Indian defence services after his graduation from the Institute of Engineering Technology, Calcutta. He participated in World War II, after which he resigned to find truth and freedom. He became a monk in 1948. He travelled all over India and also taught in Sri Lanka and Burma. Finally he established the Maha Bodhi Society in Bangalore to propagate Buddhism.

In 1952, Moonasinghe, niece of the Venerable Anagarika Dhammapala Maha Upasika —a well-known Buddhist in Bangalore, known to the Maharaja donated him an area of land for The Maha Bodhi Society. He also established schools, hostels, hospitals and an artificial limb centre for the society. He had written 150 books and published two periodicals. He was honored with Abhidhaja Aggamaha Saddhammajotika award by the Myanmar government.

He died at Maha Bodhi Society, Bangalore, on 23 September 2013.

== See also ==
- Bhadant Anand Kausalyayan (1905 – 1988)
- Rahul Sankrityayan (1893 – 1963)

== Books ==
- The Dhammapada: The Buddha's Path of Wisdom. Buddhist Publication Society, 1998. ISBN 9552401313.
- Die Weisheit des Lotus. Philosophie und Praxis buddhistischer Hingabe. ISBN 9783897672536.
- Buddhas lebendiges Erbe. Schirner Verlag, 2005. ISBN 9783897672154.
- Dem Buddha folgen. Geschichten vom Erleuchteten. Schirner Publisher, ISBN 9783897672741.
- Metta. Schirner Verlag Publisher, 2004, ISBN 9783897671775.
- Buddhist manual for everyday practice. Paperback Publisher, 1996.
- METTA: The Philosophy and Practice of Universal Love. Buddhist Publication Society, Kandy, Sri Lanka, ISBN 9552400368.
- Positive Response: How To Meet Evil With Good. Publisher - Buddhist Publication Society, Kandy, Sri Lanka, 1987
- What Meditation Implies. Publisher - Buddhist Publication Society, Kandy, Sri Lanka, 2008
- LIVING LEGACY OF THE BUDDHA. 2002.
- Mind Overcoming Its Cankers: An In-depth Study of Mental Effluents in Buddhist Perspective. Publisher - Buddha Vachana Trust, Bangalore. ISBN 9552402506.
- Dem Buddha folgen. Geschichten vom Erleuchteten. Schirner Verlag.
- Invisible protection. Publisher - Buddha Vachana Trust, 2002.
- Dhammapada: a practical guide to right living. Publisher Suki Hotu Dhamma. ISBN 9839382136.
- Unerschütterlicher Schutz. Schirner, 2007. ISBN 9783897673205.
- Halo'd Triumphs. Publisher - Buddha Vachana Trust, Bangalore, 1976.
- Dhamma. Vol. 2, No. 1 (Editor). 1977
- An Unforgettable Inheritance Part II. Publisher - Buddha Vachana Trust, Bangalore.
- An Unforgettable Inheritance Stories of Dhammapada. Publisher - Buddha Vachna Trust / Swayam Sahaya, Bangalore
- Die Lehre von Karma und Wiedergeburt. Schirner, 2004. ISBN 9783897671799.
- Copy of the Dhammapada translated by Acharya Buddharakkhita
