= Deputy High Commission of Sri Lanka, Chennai =

Diplomatic mission of Sri Lanka in South India

Coordinates: 13°2′38″N 80°15′29″E

Deputy High Commission of the Democratic Socialist Republic of Sri Lanka in Southern India
- Sri Lanka Deputy High Commission, Chennai ශ්‍රී ලංකා නියෝජ්‍ය මහකොමසාරිස් කාර්යාලය,චෙන්නායි தென் இந்தியாவிற்கான இலங்கைத் துணை உயர் ஸ்தானிகராலயம்
- Emblem of Sri Lanka
- Incumbent; Ganesanathan Geathiswaran (since August 2025)
- Ministry of External Affairs
- Style: Deputy High Commissioner for Sri Lanka in Southern India
- Formation: 1957
- Deputy: H. B. Mahindadasa (Minister & Head of Chancery)
- Website: Official website

The Deputy High Commission of the Democratic Socialist Republic of Sri Lanka in Southern India is the mission of Sri Lanka in South India and represents the interests of the Sri Lankan government in the region. It is located in Chennai. The other missions are Consulate General of the Democratic Socialist Republic of Sri Lanka, Mumbai and High Commission of the Democratic Socialist Republic of Sri Lanka, New Delhi. The Chennai Mission is responsible for the southern states of Tamil Nadu, Andhra Pradesh, Karnataka and Kerala and the union territory of Puducherry. The current deputy high commissioner is Ganesanathan Geathiswaran. He succeeds Doraisamy Venkateshwaran since August 2025.

== Location ==
The Deputy High Commission of Sri Lanka at Chennai is the closest Sri Lankan mission to the homeland in geographical terms. The chancery premises of the deputy high commission, which is its own premises, is located at 56, Sterling Road, Nungambakkam. The chancery was moved to its own premises on 20 August 2012. Previously, the chancery was located at 196, TTK Road, Alwarpet. The deputy high commission has an honorary consul office at Bangalore.

== History ==
The Sri Lankan Mission in Chennai (Madras) was established in 1957 and is one of the oldest missions of Sri Lanka. The mission office in Chennai was established as the passport and information office under the supervision of the Sri Lanka High Commission in New Delhi. In 1959, the passport office was upgraded as the Office of Assistant High Commissioner and subsequently to that of Deputy High Commissioner in 1966, with the mission playing an increasingly important role in the Southern region of the Indian subcontinent due to the geographical proximity of Chennai to Sri Lanka and its ethnic commonality with the island nation.

In order to reduce the cost of rentals being paid to mission premises in foreign countries, a new chancery building for the Chennai Mission was built in Nungambakkam. The land for the proposed building was purchased in 2000, and the foundation was laid on 21 January 2009. The foundation stone for the new building was laid by P. M. Amza, the then Deputy High Commissioner for Sri Lanka in Southern India. The construction is being handled by the Central Engineering and Consultancy Bureau (CECB) and will include the Deputy High Commission and two apartments while a separate construction within the same premises will house the official residence of the Deputy High Commissioner.

As part of revamping the diplomatic presence in India, the Deputy High Commission decided to post two additional Tamil-speaking officers from the public service at its chancery.

== List of deputy high commissioners ==
- A. Sumith Nakandala (2001–2006)
- P. M. Amza (2006−31 July 2009)
- Vadivel Krishnamoorthy (1 August 2009–March 2012)
- R. K. M. A. Rajakaruna (9 March 2012–May 2013)
- Ahamed Lebbe Sabarullah Khan (15 May 2013–30 June 2015)
- Vadivel Krishnamoorthy (July 2015–2020)
- Doraisamy Venkateshwaran (12 April 2021–August 2025)
- Ganesanathan Geathiswaran (August 2025–present)

== Security ==
Following threats from various organisations and political parties in 2010, the deputy high commission has been provided with security by the Tamil Nadu government.

== Trade between India and Sri Lanka ==
In February 2013, the Sri Lanka Export Development Board (SLEDB) established a trade centre in Chennai at a cost of ₹ 17 million as a permanent gateway facilitating trade between Sri Lanka and India. Handled by a Sri Lankan state-owned organisation, the trade centre was aimed as an economical alternative to road shows and promotional activities. The trade centre display products such as apparel, artificial flowers, confectioneries, footwear and leather products, gems and jewellery, herbal products, light engineering products, porcelain, tableware, tea and transportation.

== See also ==
- Attacks on Sri Lankans in Tamil Nadu
- Sri Lanka Maha Bodhi Centre, Chennai
- List of diplomatic missions in Chennai
- India–Sri Lanka relations
- List of diplomatic missions of Sri Lanka
- Foreign relations of India
- Foreign relations of Sri Lanka
