= Banagala Upatissa Thero =

Sri Lankan Buddhist monk

- බානගල උපතිස්ස නාහිමි
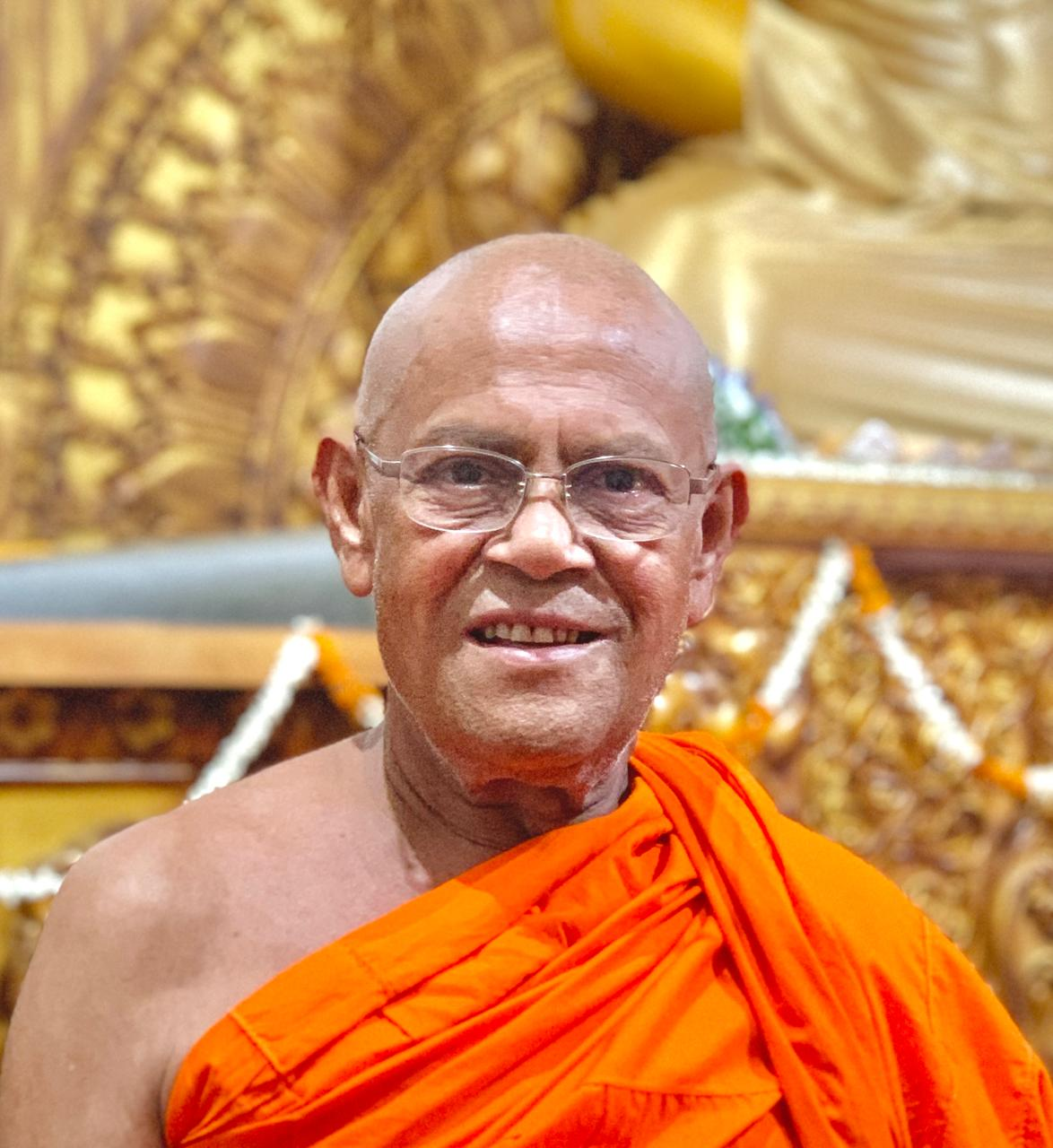
- Banagala Upatissa Thero in 2025
- Title: President of the Mahabodhi Society of Sri Lanka; Chief Sangha Nayaka for Japan

Personal life
- Born: 5 January 1950 (age 76) Banagala, Southern Province, Sri Lanka
- Education: B.A. and M.A. from Bhopal University
- Occupation: Buddhist monk

Religious life
- Religion: Buddhism
- School: Theravada

Banagala Upatissa Thero (Sinhala: බානගල උපතිස්ස නාහිමි) (born 5 January 1950) is a Sri Lankan Buddhist monk. He is the President of the Mahabodhi Society of Sri Lanka, the Sri Lankan branch of the Mahabodhi Society founded by Anagarika Dharmapala, and serves as the Chief Sangha Nayaka for Japan. He has participated in forums on interfaith dialogue and peace.

== Early life and education ==
Upatissa Thero was born in Banagala, in the Southern Province of Sri Lanka. He was ordained as a Buddhist monk at the age of 17 under Hedigalle Pannatissa Maha Nayaka Thero. He studied at Mahabodhi Inter College in Sarnath, India, and later obtained a Bachelor of Arts degree from Bhopal University in 1973 and a Master of Arts degree in Indology and Museology from the same university in 1975.

== Religious career ==
=== Mahabodhi Society of Sri Lanka ===
As President of the Mahabodhi Society of Sri Lanka, Upatissa Thero has been involved in maintaining links between Sri Lanka and other Buddhist countries. In 2015, he and other senior members of the Society extended an invitation to the 14th Dalai Lama to visit Sri Lanka; the visit did not take place due to visa restrictions.

=== Chief Incumbent of Mahabodhi Agrasrawaka Maha Vihara, Colombo ===
Upatissa Thero is the Chief Incumbent of the Mahabodhi Agrasrawaka Maha Vihara, located at Maligakanda, Colombo. The temple houses relics of Arahants Sariputta and Moggallana, unearthed in the mid-19th century at Sanchi and Satdhara in India.

In January 2015, Pope Francis visited the temple, which was described as the second recorded papal visit to a Buddhist place of worship.

=== Lanka-ji Temple, Japan ===
In 1989, Upatissa Thero founded Shiyukiyohopin Lanka-ji Temple in Sawara, Chiba Prefecture, Japan. The temple hosts Vesak celebrations and Dhamma discussions in Japanese.

=== Chief Incumbent of Sanchi Chetiyagiri Vihara, India ===
Upatissa Thero is the Chief Incumbent of the Sanchi Chetiyagiri Vihara in Madhya Pradesh, India. The temple, located within the Sanchi complex (a UNESCO World Heritage Site), houses relics of Arahants Sariputta and Moggallana. It hosts the annual Sanchi Mahabodhi Mahotsava, which was first held in 1952 with the participation of then Indian Prime Minister Jawaharlal Nehru.

== Interfaith Dialogue ==
Upatissa Thero has taken part in interreligious dialogue with Buddhist, Christian, Hindu and Muslim representatives. His participation has included a 2003 meeting with representatives of the Liberation Tigers of Tamil Eelam during the Sri Lankan peace process, a 2015 interfaith conference in Pakistan, and a 2017 forum in Colombo on the role of religious and faith-based organisations in humanitarian response. In 2022, he led a Sri Lankan Buddhist delegation to a Muslim World League forum in Riyadh, Saudi Arabia, and in 2024 he attended the International Conference of Religious Leaders in Kuala Lumpur, Malaysia.
