= Vishnupada =

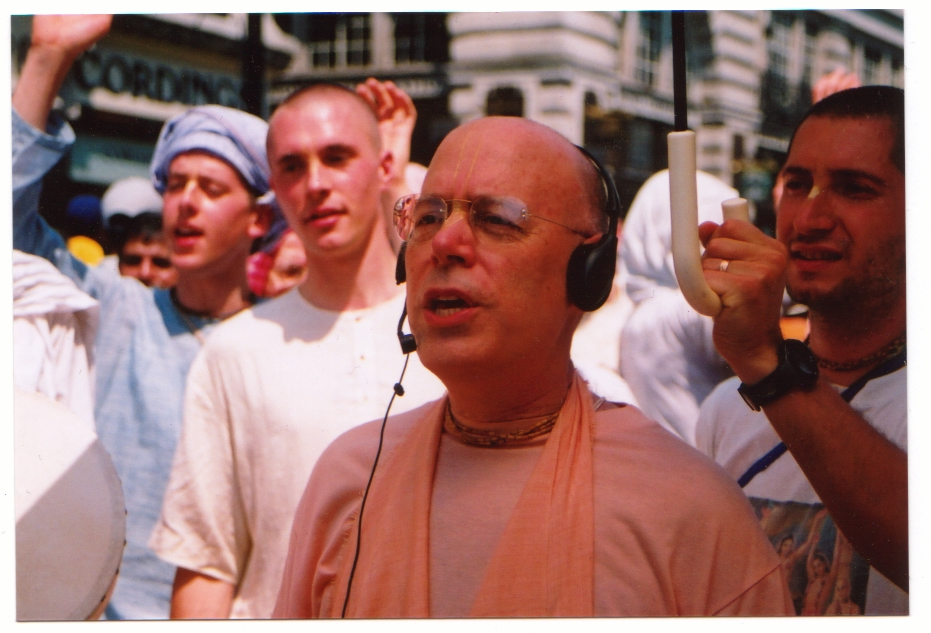
Tamala Krishna Goswami singing at the Rath Yatra festival in London, 1999.

Vishnupadas are songs in praise of Vishnu/God or of his popular avatars, Krishna/Rama.
