= Maha Bodhi Society =

South Asian Buddhist movement and organisation

The Maha Bodhi Society is a South Asian Buddhist society presently based in Kolkata, India. Founded by the Sri Lankan Buddhist leader Anagarika Dharmapala and the British journalist and poet Sir Edwin Arnold, its first office was in Bodh Gaya. The organisation's efforts began in order to resuscitate Buddhism in India, and to restore the ancient Buddhist shrines at Bodh Gaya, Sarnath and Kushinara. The restoration and revival of the glory and sanctity of Bodh Gaya are also aims of Maha Bodhi Society.

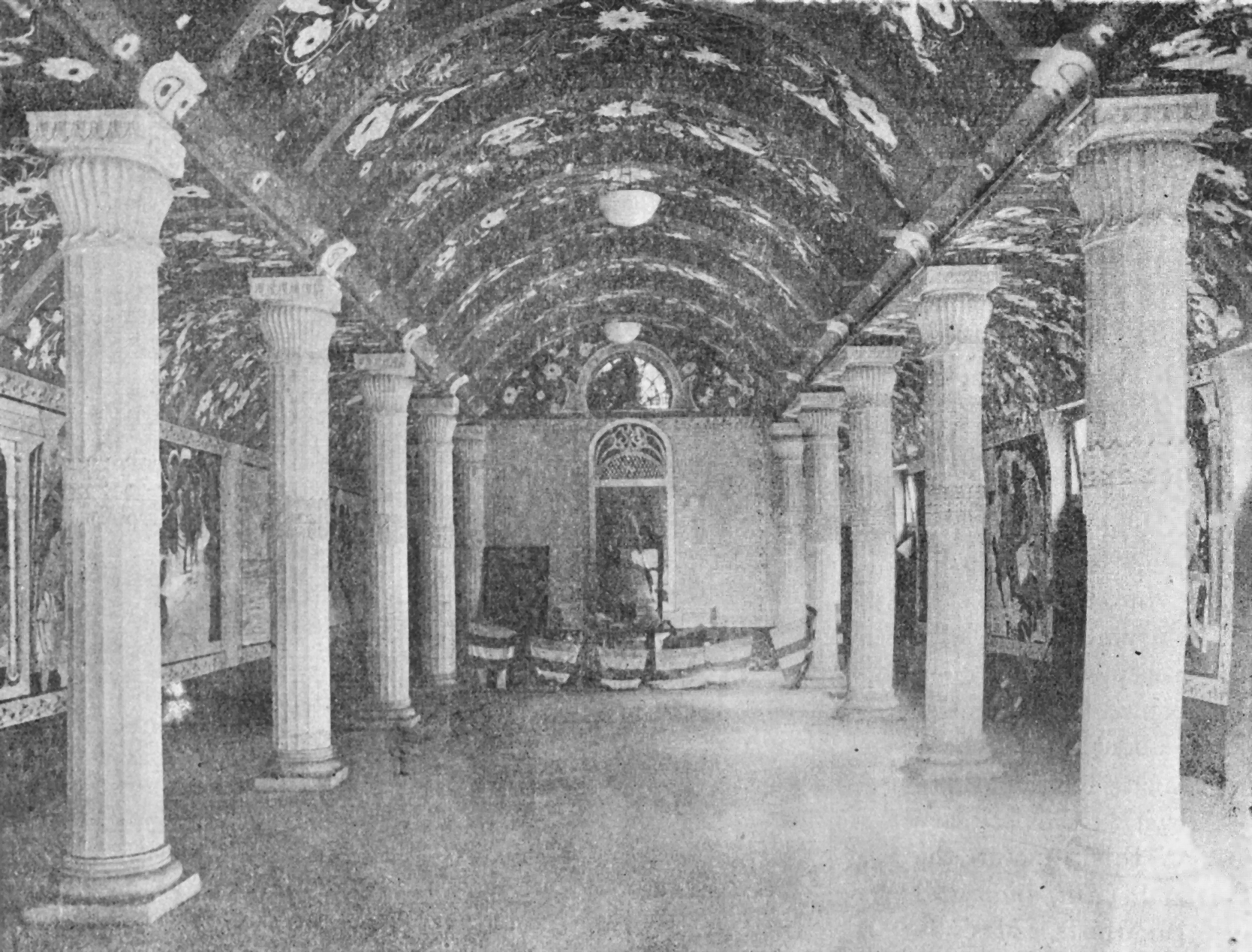
Interior of the Dharmarajika Chetiya Vihara of the Maha Bodhi Society, College Square, Kolkata, official opening on 26 November 1920.

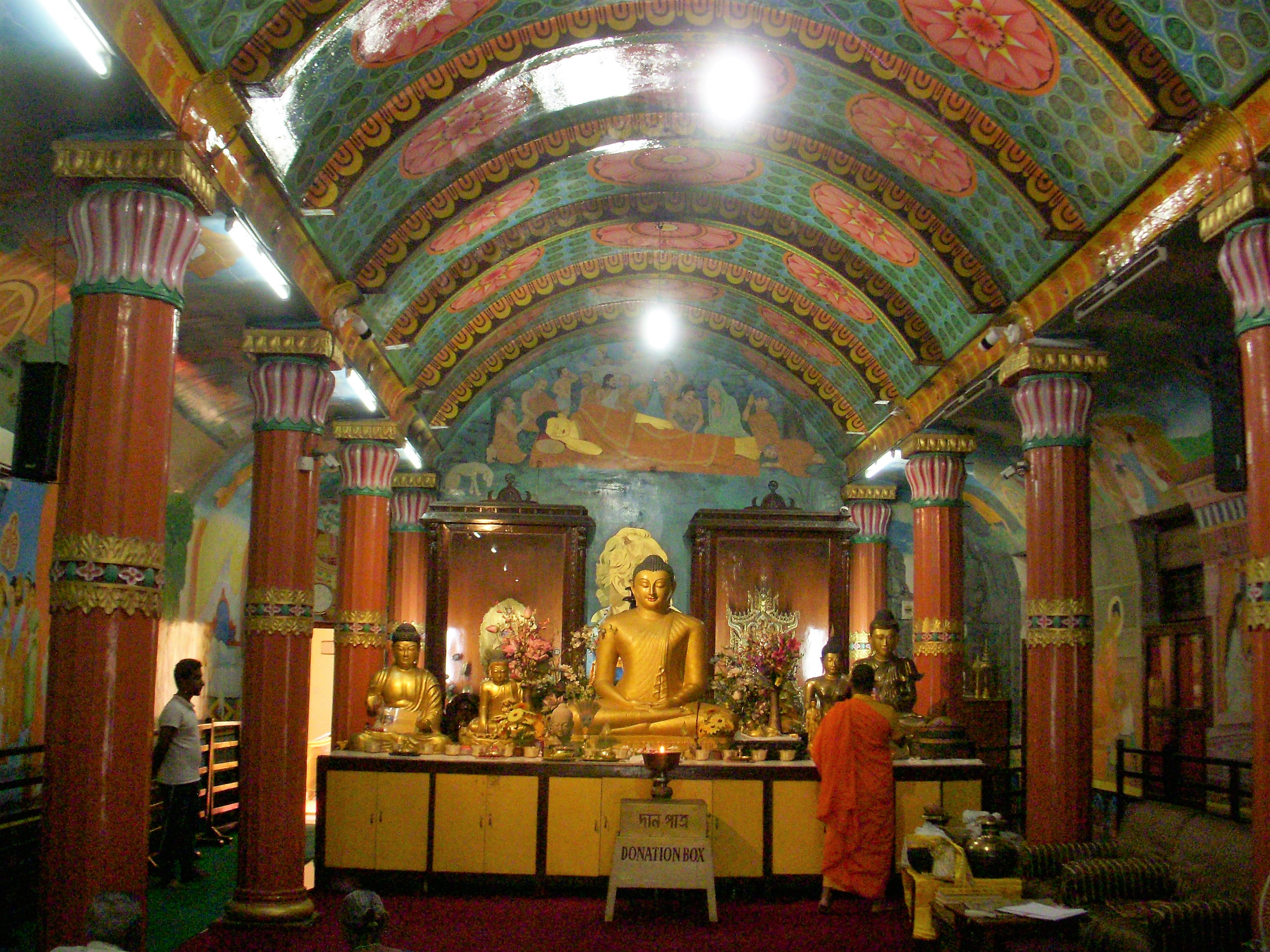
Inside view of the Maha Bodhi Society

Although many Indians had remained culturally Buddhist for centuries after the decline of Buddhism, they did not self-identify as "Buddhist". The Maha Bodhi Society renewed interest in Buddhism, and spawned the Ladakh Buddhist Association, All Assam Buddhist Association, and Himalayan Buddhist Society, as well as laying the grounds for the Dalit Buddhist movement.

Headquarters, Maha Bodhi Society of India, Chatterjee Street, Kolkata. October 2014.

== Origins ==
In 1891, while on pilgrimage to the recently restored Mahabodhi Temple at Bodh Gaya, the location where Siddhartha Gautama (the Buddha) attained enlightenment, Anagarika Dharmapala had experienced a shock to find the temple in the hands of a Saivite priest, the Buddha image transformed into a Hindu icon and Buddhists barred from worship. As a result, he began an agitation movement. Prior to that, in 1885 Sir Edwin Arnold visited the site and published several articles drawing the attention of the Buddhists to the deplorable conditions of Bodh Gaya. The Buddhist renaissance inaugurated by Anagarika Dharmapala through his Mahabodhi Movement has also been described as "conservative" for it considered Muslim conquest in the Indian subcontinent responsible for the decay of Buddhism in India, in the then current mood of Hindu-Buddhist brotherhood.

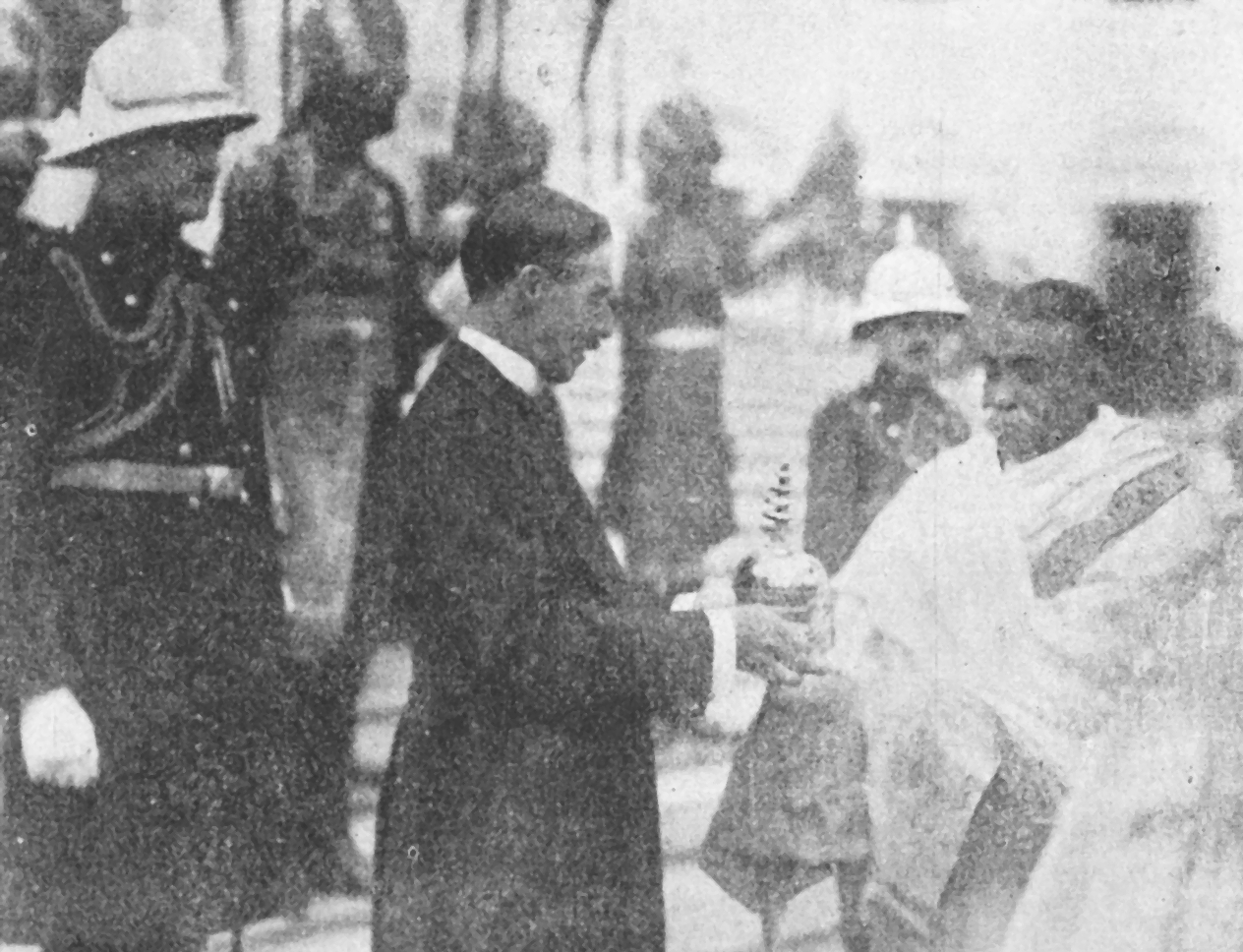
Lawrence Dundas, Lord Ronaldshay and Governor of Bengal (1917–22) presents the Buddha relic which had been discovered 1892 in Battiporolu to Ashutosh Mukherjee, then Vice Chancellor of Calucatta University, acting Chief Justice of the Calcutta High Court and President of the Mahabodhi Society, Calcutta to be enshrined in the newly opened Dharmarajika Chetiya Vihara on College Square. Morning of 26th Nov. 1920 on the steps of Government House, Calcutta.

The Mahabodhi Society at Colombo was founded in 1891 but its offices were moved to Calcutta the following year. One of its primary aims was the restoration of the Mahabodhi Temple at Bodh Gaya, the chief of the four ancient holy sites to Buddhist control. To accomplish this Dharmapala initiated a lawsuit against the Brahmin priests who had held control of the site for centuries. After a protracted struggle this was successful with the partial restoration of the site to the management of the Maha Bodhi Society in 1949.

Maha Bodhi Society branches have been established in several countries, most significantly in India and Sri Lanka. The current President of the Mahabodhi Society of Sri Lanka branch is Banagala Upatissa Thero. A United States branch was founded by Dr. Paul Carus in Chicago.

The Mahā Bodhī Society of Beṅgaḷūru, founded by Buddharakkhita Ācariya in 1956, is a sister organisation that functions and is administered independently.

== Mahabodhi Temple ==
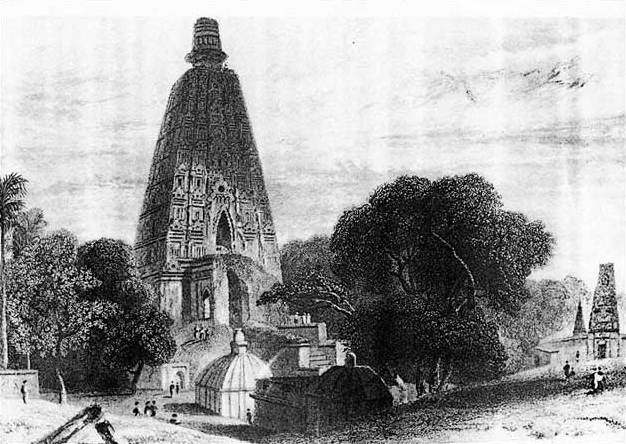
The temple as it appeared in the 1780s

After the defeat of the Palas by the Hindu Sena dynasty, Buddhism's position again began to erode and was soon followed by the conquest of Magadha by General Ikhtiar Uddin Muhammad Bin Bakhtiyar Khilji. During this period, the Mahabodhi Temple fell into disrepair and was largely abandoned. During the 16th century, a Hindu monastery was established near Bodh Gaya. Over the following centuries, the monastery's abbot or mahant became the area's primary landholder and claimed ownership of the Mahabodhi Temple grounds.

In the 1880s, the then-British government of India began to restore Mahabodhi Temple under the direction of Sir Alexander Cunningham. In 1885, Sir Edwin Arnold visited the site and published several articles drawing the attention of the Buddhists to the deplorable conditions of Buddhagaya. He was guided in this undertaking by Ven. Weligama Sri Sumangala. In 1891, Anagarika Dharmapala started a campaign to return control of the temple to Buddhists, over the objections of the mahant. The campaign was partially successful in 1949, when control passed from the Hindu mahant to the state government of Bihar, which established a temple management committee. The committee has nine members, a majority of whom, including the chairman, must by law be Hindus. Mahabodhi's first head monk under the management committee was Anagarika Munindra, a Bengali man who had been an active member of the Maha Bodhi Society.

== Mulagandha Kuty Vihara in Sarnath ==
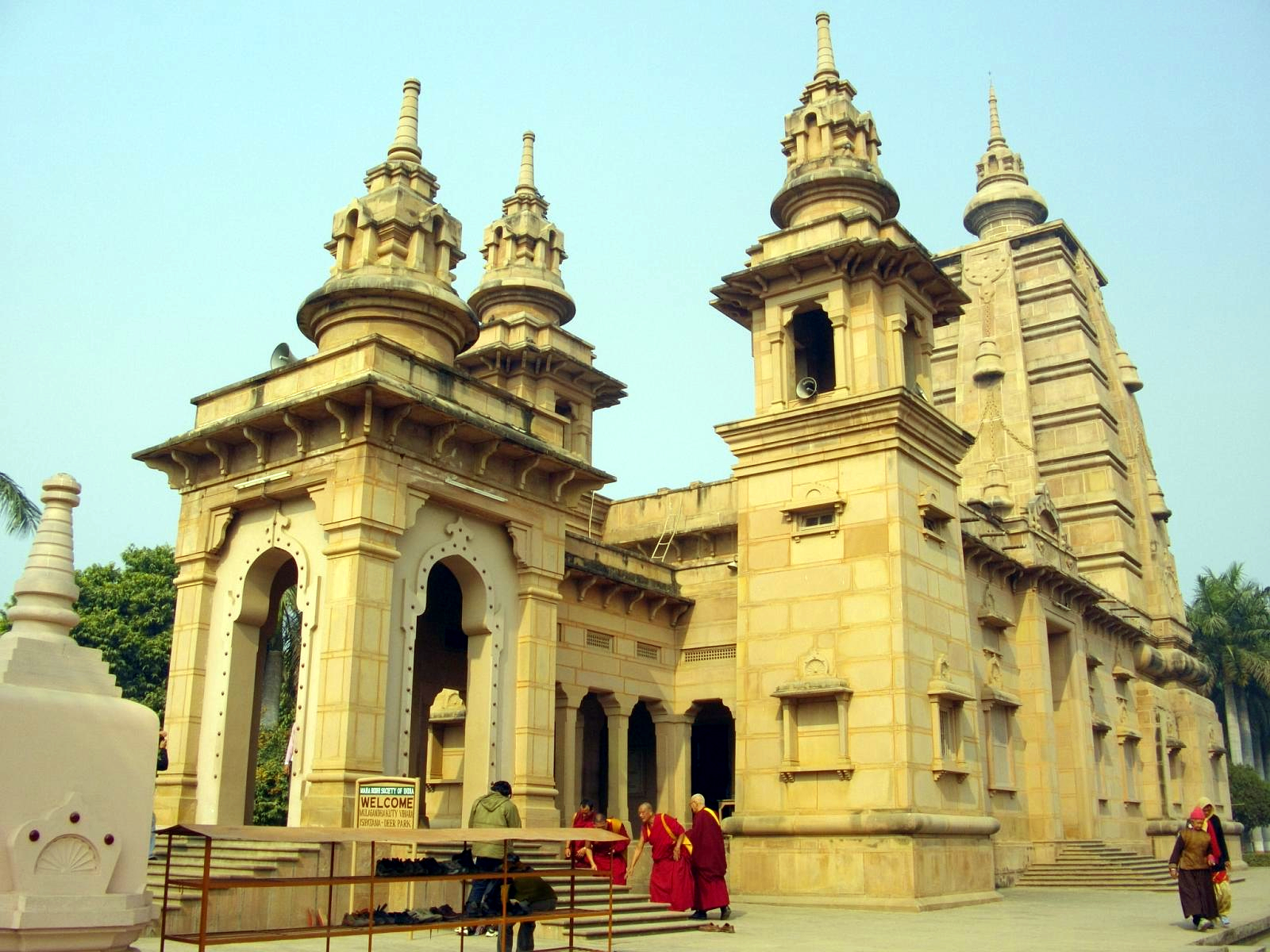
Mahabodhi Mulagandhakuti Buddhist Temple at Sarnath

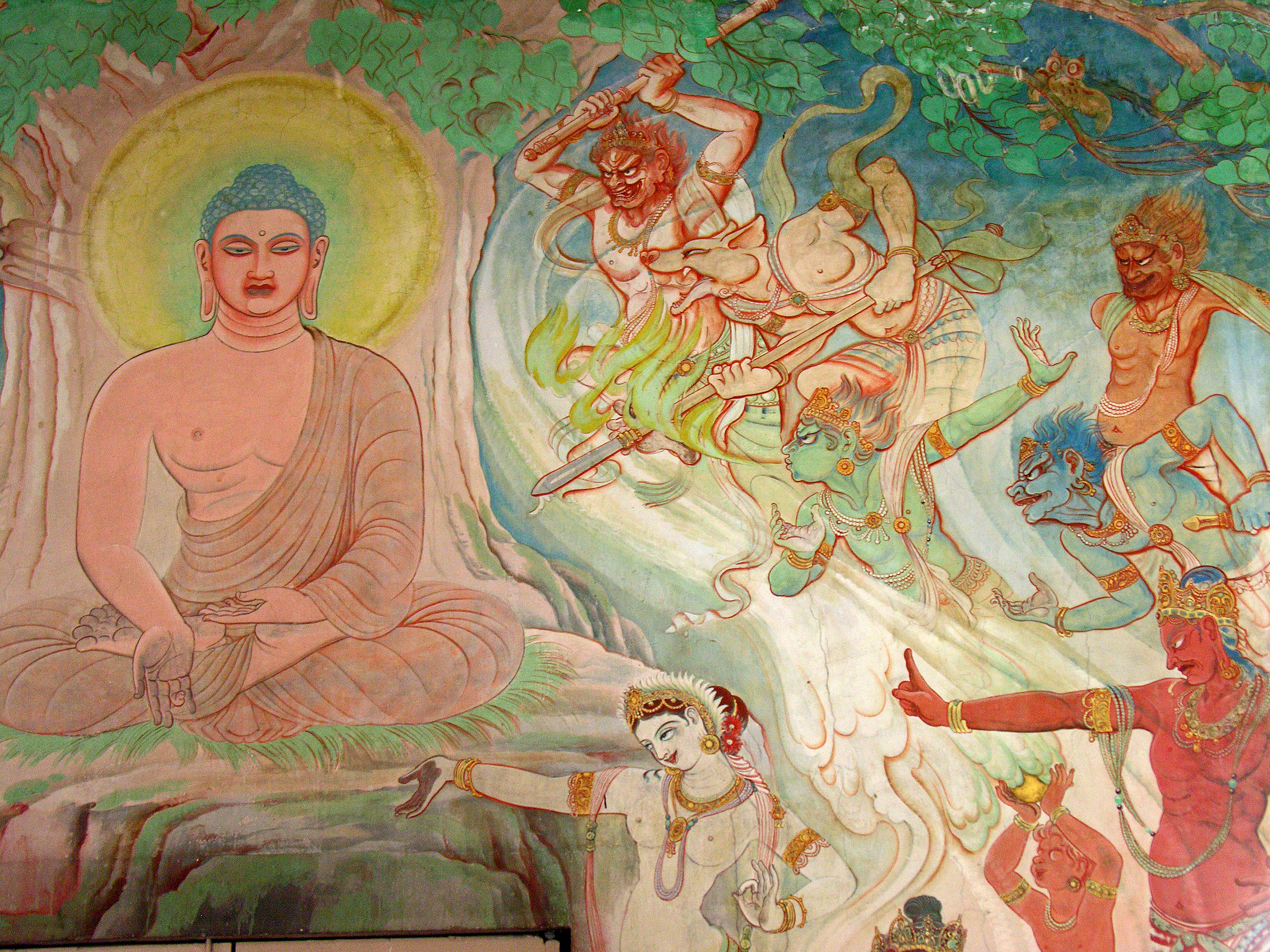
Mulagandhakuti fresco by Kosetsu Nosu

Mulagandha Kuty Vihara in Sarnath is a fitting reminder of Sarnath's past glory. It is also the crowning and most glorious achievement of Anagarika Dharmapala's lifelong dedication. The construction of the Mulagandha Kuty Vihara was taken up by Anagarika Dharmapala in 1926, towards the end of his pious life. When he decided to construct a temple at Sarnath and after making the architectural plans, his generous Hawaiian patron, Mary Robinson Foster, donated the first financial assistance that came from her parents, brother and well-wishers. Anagarika Dharmapala personally supervised the constructional works. The 200 feet high magnificent temple was opened to public in 1931. Later a reputed Japanese artist Kosetsu Nosu (1885–1973) and his assistant undertook the task to decorate the temple walls with fresco paintings famously as the Mural paintings of Mulagandha Kuty Vihara, depicting the life events of Sakyamuni Buddha. On the opening day of the Vihara, the Buddha's relics donated to Anagarika Dharmapala by Govt. of India under the British Raj was enshrined in the temple. The Vihara, an attractive place of Buddhist worship was visited by numerous Indian and foreign dignitaries and millions of pilgrims and tourists over the past decades. At the Mulagandha Kuty Vihara annual function in November, the most attractive item among the programs is the exposition of the Buddha's sacred relic. People from different countries and from the homeland visit the Vihara to homage to the sacred relic considering it as a rare and an opportune moment in their lifetime.

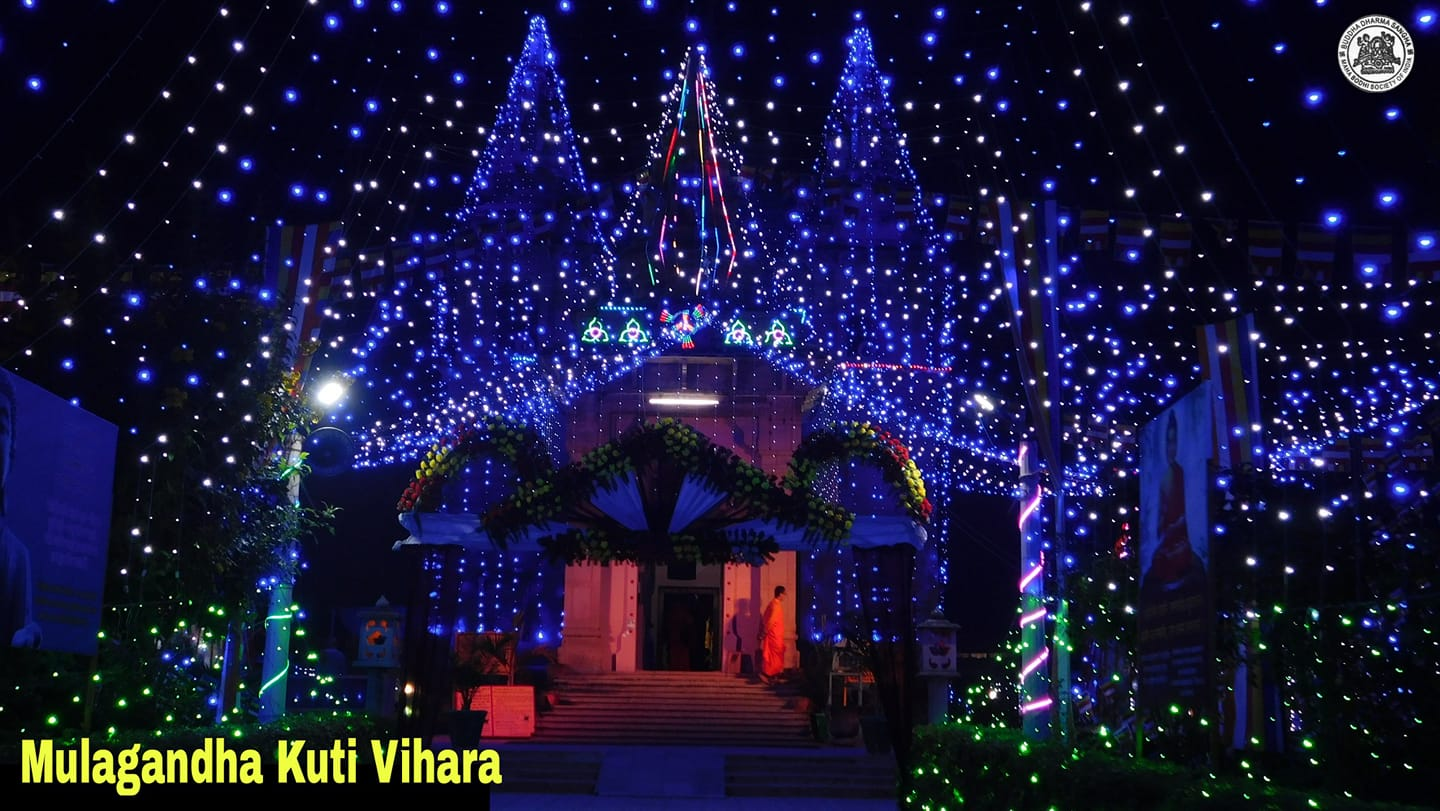
The night view of Sarnath's Mulagandha Kuty Vihara

== Publications ==
The Maha Bodhi Society has a robust tradition of publications, spanning from Pali translations into modern Indian vernacular languages (such as Hindi) to scholarly texts and new editions of Pali works typeset in Devanagari to appeal to a Hindi-educated Indian audience. They have also published books and pamphlets in local/regional languages and dialects, sometimes in partnership with other presses. The Journal of the Maha Bodhi Society has been published since 1892.

== Leadership ==
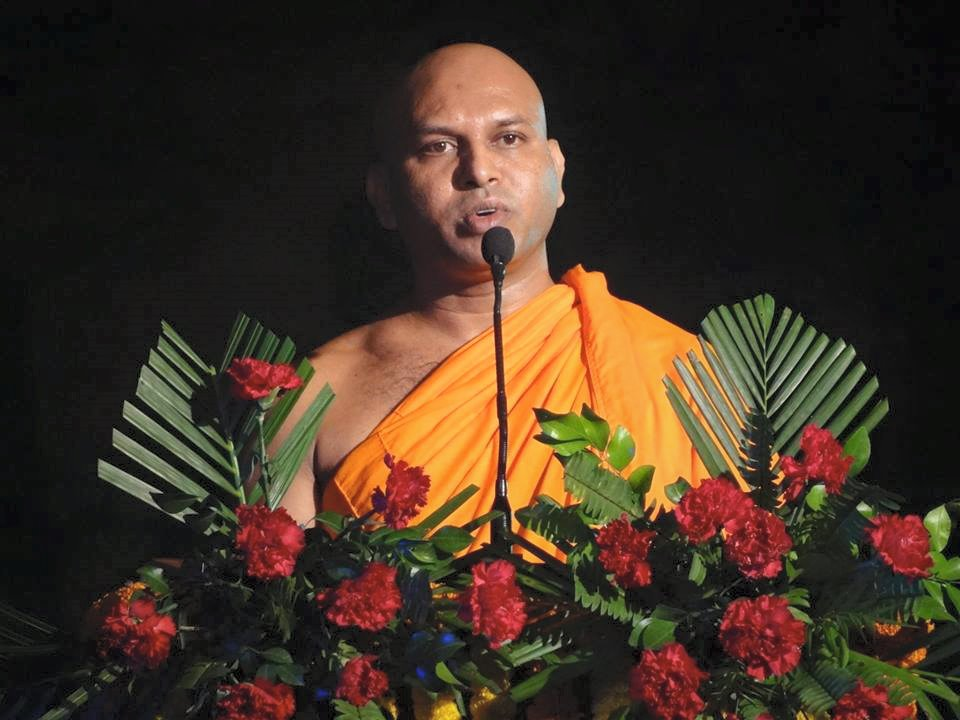
Ven. P Seewalee Thera, the current General Secretary of the Maha Bodhi Society of India at an event in Sarnath

Most Venerable P. Seewalee Thera is serving as the 12th and current general secretary of the Maha Bodhi Society of India since 2016 and the joint secretaries are Venerable Kahatagollawe Medhankara Thera and Ven. Rathmalwa Sumithananda Thera.

At a meeting in September 2008, the Maha Bodhi Society passed a rule that only persons born into Buddhist families will be eligible to serve as president or as one of the vice-presidents of the society. The outgoing president, B. K. Modi, a Hindu, assumed the position of patron. At the same meeting, the 14th Dalai Lama was given the new title of chief patron.

== See also ==
- Acharya Buddharakkhita
- Anagarika Munindra
- Hammalawa Saddhatissa
- London Buddhist Vihara
- Sri Lanka Maha Bodhi Centre, Chennai
- Buddhism in India
