= Buddhism in Sri Lanka =

ථෙරවාද බුද්ධ ශාසනය Theravāda Buddha Sāsana
- බුද්ධ ශාසනයේ ධජය; Flag of the Buddha Sāsana

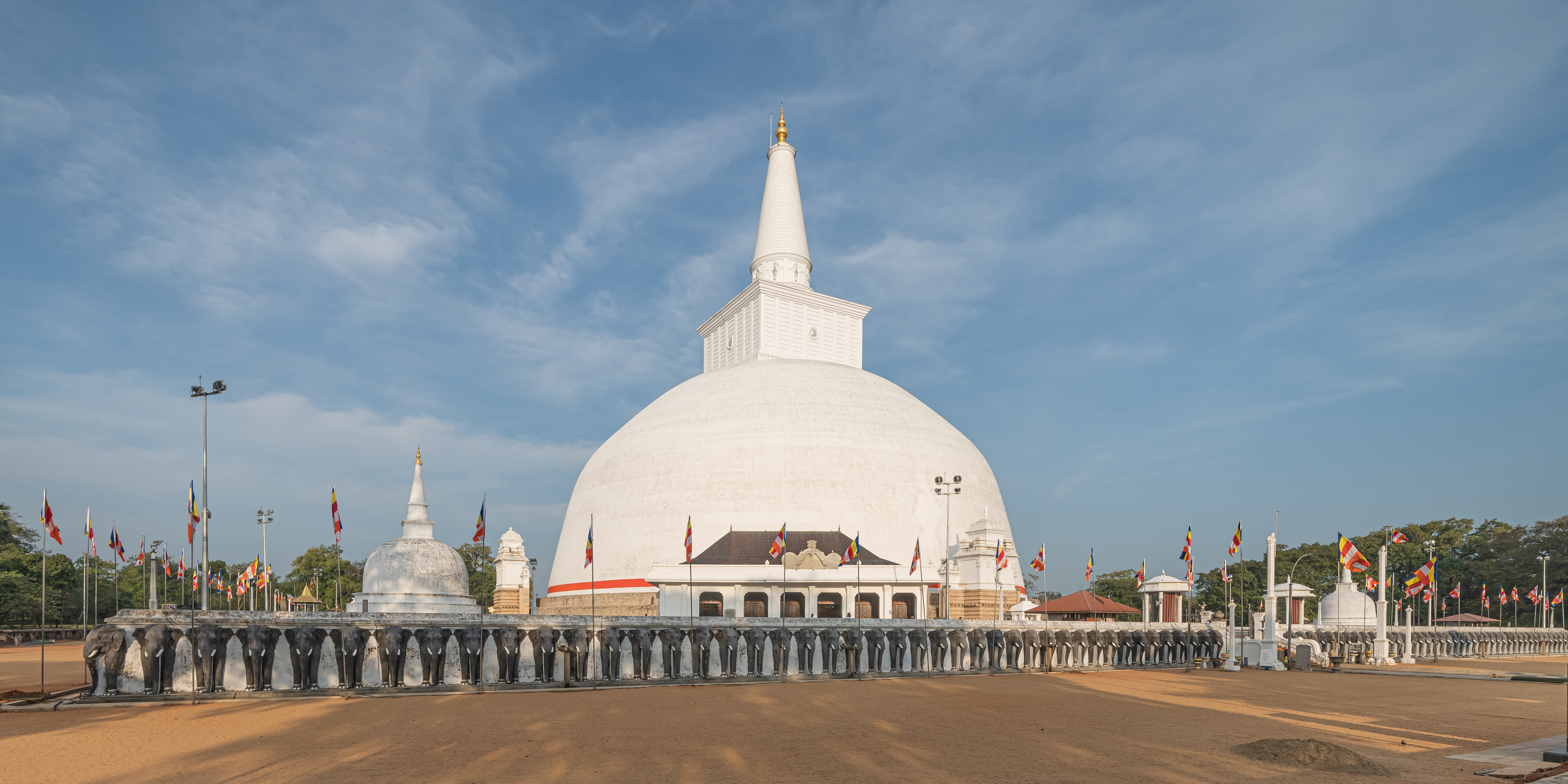
- Ruwanwelisaya Stupa in Anuradhapura, the largest Buddhist temple complex in Sri Lanka

Total population
- 15,199,093 (69.8%) in 2024

Founder
- Gautama Buddha

Religions
- Theravada Buddhism

Scriptures
- Pāli Canon

Languages
- Sinhalese; Pali; English

Theravada Buddhism is the largest and official religion of Sri Lanka, practiced by 69.8% of the population as of 2012. Practitioners of Sri Lankan Buddhism can be found amongst the majority Sinhalese population as well as among the minority ethnic groups, most notably the Sri Lankan Chinese. Sri Lankan Buddhists share many similarities with Southeast Asian Buddhists, specifically Thai Buddhists and Burmese Buddhists due to traditional and cultural exchange. Sri Lanka is one of only five countries in the world with a Theravada Buddhist majority, and others are Thailand, Cambodia, Laos and Myanmar.

Buddhism has been declared as the state religion under Article 9 of the Sri Lankan Constitution which can be traced back to an attempt to bring the status of Buddhism back to the status it enjoyed prior to the Dutch and British colonial eras. Sri Lanka is one of the oldest traditionally Buddhist countries.

The island has been a centre of Buddhist scholarship and practices since the introduction of Buddhism in the 3rd century BCE producing eminent scholars such as Buddhaghosa and preserving the vast Pāli Canon. Throughout most of its history, Sri Lankan kings have played a major role in the maintenance and revival of the Buddhist institutions of the island. During the 19th century, a modern Buddhist revival took place on the island which promoted Buddhist education. Due to the island's close ties with India, Sinhalese Buddhism has been in part influenced by Hinduism and indigenous beliefs, and some Buddhists share similar beliefs with Hindus, such as the worship of Hindu deities, the caste system, and Animism. Pre-Buddhist historical accounts of Sri Lanka reveal a significant impact of Indian religious trends on the society of Lanka. Some traditional Sinhalese Temple layout also includes individual shrines dedicated to Hindu gods. Some of the most important Hindu gods worshipped by some Sinhalese Buddhists include Wisnu (Vishnu), Murugan (Kartikeya), Pathini, Nata, Gambara, Dedimunda, Saraswati, Ganesha, Laksmi (Lakshmi), Siwa (Shiva), and Kali. According to a 2023 Pew Survey, Majority (84%) of the Sri Lankan Buddhist said they pray and offer their respects to Ganesh. Similarly Majority (71%) of the Sri Lankan Hindus reported the same for Buddha. Demons and spirits are also invoked during Exorcisms and rituals, which seem to be customs passed down from Pre-Buddhist indigenous times. According to the Department of Buddhist Affairs' 2024 performance report, Sri Lanka has 12,235 registered Buddhist temples, 42,122 registered Buddhist monks, 743 dasasil matha monasteries, and 38 registered devales.

== History ==
=== Anuradhapura period (377 BC–1017) ===
The Theravāda ("Elders") is a branch of the Vibhajjavāda ("Doctrine of Analysis", "the analysts") school, which was a division of the Sthāvira Nikāya, one of the Indian early Buddhist schools. The Sthāviras had emerged from the first schism in the Buddhist community. There is no agreement among modern historians on the details and dating of this schism (even on if it was before or after the date of the emperor Ashoka: 304–232 BCE). It is notable that Ashokan inscriptions do not refer to this council or the schism.

According to Theravāda sources, the Theravāda school maintains the Vibhajjavāda doctrines that were agreed upon during the putative Third Buddhist council held around 250 BCE under the patronage of Ashoka and the guidance of the elder Moggaliputta-Tissa. A record of their doctrinal position survives in the Kathavatthu ("Points of Controversy"), a refutation of various opposing views of various schools at the time.

The Vibhajjavādins, fueled by Mauryan patronage (as can be seen in Ashoka's edicts), spread throughout South Asia, forming different groups and communities. In South India, they had an influential center at Avanti, as well as being active in Andhra, Vanavasa (in modern Karnataka), Amaravati and Nagarjunakonda. As they became established in Sri Lanka (at Anuradhapura), they also started to become known as the Tambapaṇṇiya (Sanskrit: Tāmraśāṭīya, Tāmraparṇīya), the name refers to a red copper-like colour. The name Tāmraparṇi also became a name for Sri Lanka itself.

==== Introduction of Buddhism to the island ====
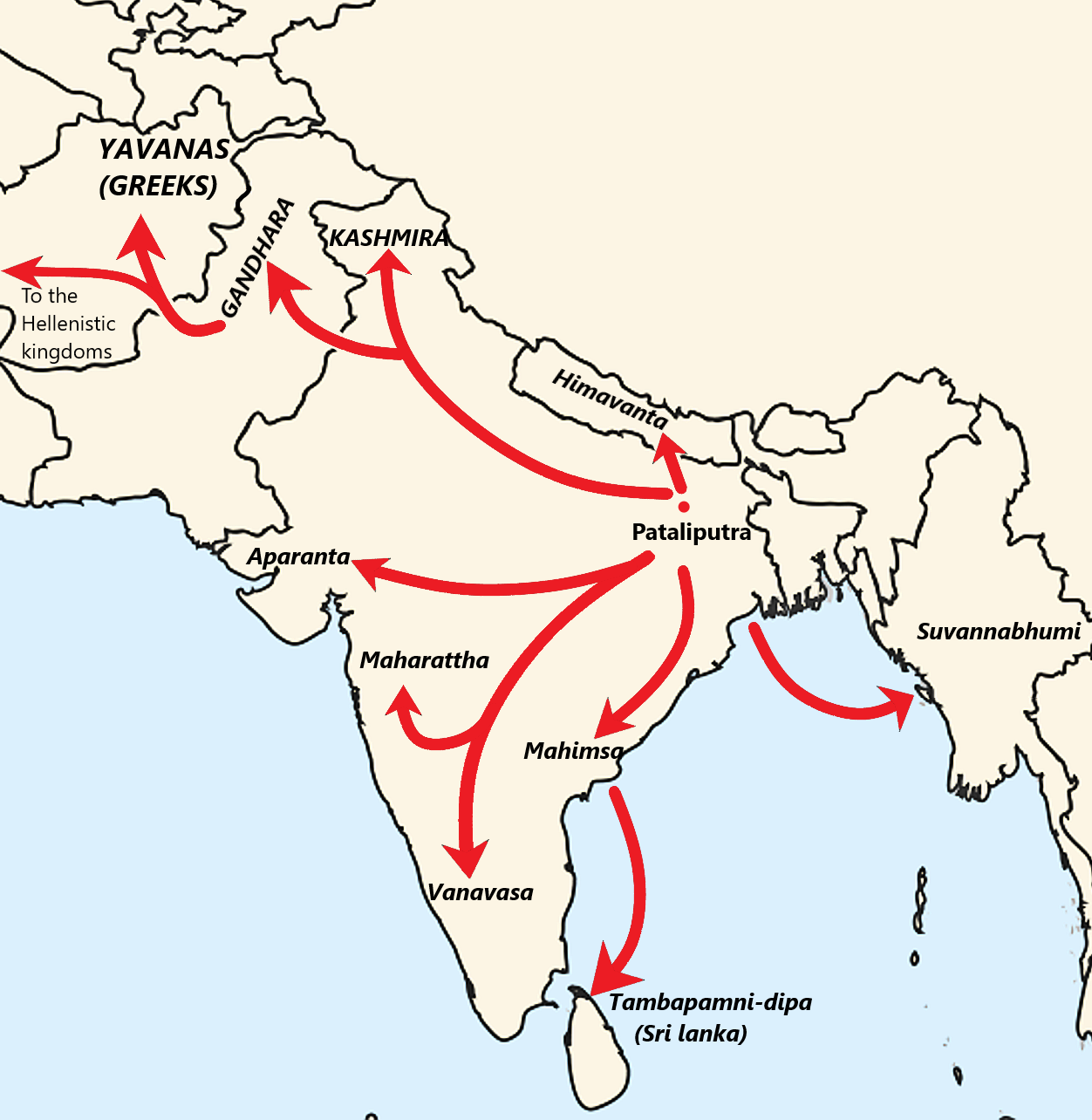
Map of the Buddhist missions during the reign of Ashoka.

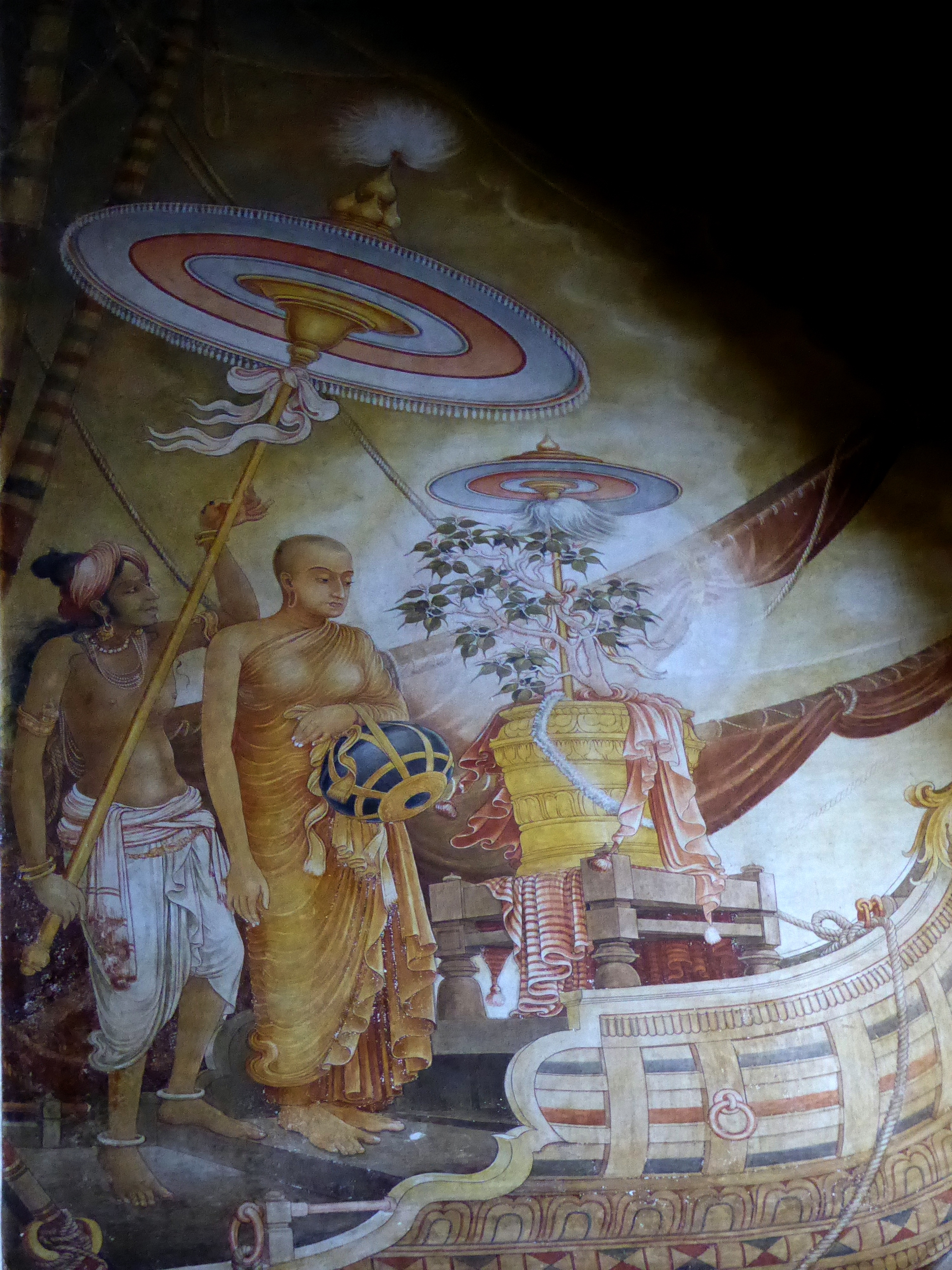
Sanghamitta, carrying a sapling of the Bodhi Tree, the tree under which the Buddha attained awakening.

According to traditional Sri Lankan chronicles such as the Mahavamsa and the Dipavamsa, Buddhism was introduced into the island in the third century BCE after the Third Buddhist council by the elder Mahinda and by the elder nun Sanghamitta. According to the Sri Lankan chronicles, both were children of the emperor Ashoka. Although Ashoka's Edicts mention sending a Buddhist mission to Sri Lanka (among many other places), nowhere do the edicts specifically mention Mahinda or Sanghamitta. Thus, the claims aren't fully accepted by modern scholars.

According to the Mahavamsa, they arrived in Sri Lanka during the Anuradhapura period in the reign of Devanampiya Tissa (307–267 BCE) who converted to Buddhism and helped build the first Buddhist stupas and communities. Tissa donated a royal park in the city to the Buddhist community, which was the beginning of the Mahāvihāra tradition. Mahinda is associated with the site of Mihintale, one of the oldest Buddhist site in Sri Lanka. Mihintale includes numerous caves which may have been used by the early Sri Lankan sangha.

According to S. D. Bandaranayake, the spread of Buddhism in this period was promoted by the state as well as by lay persons. While there are few artistic or architectural remains from this initial period, there are hundreds of Buddhist caves that have survived that contain numerous Brahmi inscriptions which record gifts to the sangha by householders and chiefs.

Bandaranayake states that the religion seems to have achieved "undisputed authority" during the reigns of Dutugamy and Valagamba (c. mid-2nd century BCE to mid-1st century BCE). K. M. de Silva states that by the first century BCE, Buddhism was "well established in the main areas of settlement." De Silva also notes that as Buddhism was adopted by the Sinhalese, it assimilated pre-Buddhist cults, rituals and ceremonies. Buddhism became a powerful factor in the unification of Sri Lankan under a single political power with a unified culture.

The Mahavamsa §29 records that during the rule of the Greco-Bactrian King Menander I (165/155 –130 BCE), a Yona (Greek) head monk named Mahadharmaraksita led 30,000 Buddhist monks from "the Yona city of Alasandra" (Alexandria in the Caucasus, around 150 kilometres (93 mi) north of modern Kabul, Afghanistan) to Sri Lanka for the dedication of the Ruwanwelisaya Stupa in Anuradhapura. This happened during the reign of the Sinhala king Dutugamunu (161 BC to 137 BCE), who was the first to truly unite the various Sri Lankan states on the island into one polity by defeating the Tamils who had conquered the north.

==== Theravāda in the Anuradhapura Kingdom ====
Abhayagiriya Monastery with Samadhi Statue, Kuttam Pokuna (twin pond) and moonstone.

The culture, laws, and government of the Anuradhapura Kingdom (as well as the other kingdoms which were mostly subservient to it) was strongly influenced by Buddhism.

Over much of the early history of Anuradhapura Buddhism, there were three subdivisions of Theravāda, consisting of the Mahāvihāra, Abhayagiri and Jetavana sects. All three were based in Anuradhapura, the large and populous capital of the ancient Sinhalese kings, which saw themselves as the defenders and supporters of Buddhism.

The Mahāvihāra was the first tradition to be established, while Abhayagiri Vihāra and Jetavana Vihāra were established by monks who had broken away from Mahāvihāra and were more open to Mahayana. According to A. K. Warder, the Indian Mahīśāsaka sect also established itself in Sri Lanka alongside the Theravāda, into which they were later absorbed. Northern regions of Sri Lanka also seem to have been ceded to sects from India at certain times.

Abhayagiri Theravādins maintained close relations with Indian Buddhists over the centuries, adopting many of the latter's teachings, including many Mahāyāna elements, whereas Jetavana Theravādins adopted Mahāyāna to a lesser extent. The Mahāvihāra tradition meanwhile considered many of the Mahāyāna doctrines, such as Lokottaravāda ("transcendentalism"), as heretical and considered the Mahāyāna sutras as being counterfeit scriptures.

Religious debate and conflict among these sects were also not unusual, particularly because the close relationship between the sangha and Sinhalese rulers led to competition for royal patronage, though most rulers supported all sects. During the reign of Voharika Tissa (209–31 CE), the Mahāvihāra tradition convinced the king to repress the Mahāyān teachings, which they saw as incompatible with the true doctrine.

The tables were turned during the reign of the king Mahasena (277 to 304 CE), which was marked by his support of Mahāyāna Buddhism and repression of the Mahāvihāra, which refused to convert to Mahāyāna. Mahasena went as far as to destroy some of the buildings of the Mahāvihāra complex to build up Abhayagiri and a new monastery, the Jetavana. Due to this, Abhiyagiri emerged as the largest and most influential Buddhist tradition on the island, and the Mahāvihāra tradition would not regain its dominant position until the Polonnaruwa period in 1055.

During the reign of Kithsirimevan (301–328 CE), Sudatta, the sub-king of Kalinga, and Hemamala brought the Tooth Relic of the Buddha to Sri Lanka. Kithsirimevan enshrined the relic and ordered a procession to be held annually in its honour. The Tooth Relic of the Buddha soon became one of the most sacred objects in the country, and a symbol of Sinhala Buddhist kingship. It was housed and promoted by the Abhayagiri tradition.

When the Chinese monk Faxian visited the island in the early 5th century, he noted 5000 monks at Abhayagiri, 3000 at the Mahāvihāra, and 2000 at the Cetiyapabbatavihāra. Faxian also obtained a Sanskrit copy of the Vinaya of the Mahīśāsaka at the Abhayagiri vihāra (c. 406). This was then translated into Chinese and remains extant in the Chinese Buddhist canon as Taishō Tripiṭaka 1421.

The main architectural feature of Sri Lankan Buddhism at this time was the dome-shaped stupa, which enshrined Buddhist relics and were objects of veneration. In Anuradhapura, the five most important stupas were: the Thuparama (part of the Mahāvihāra complex), the Mirisavati, the Ruvanvalisaya (also known as the Mahastupa), the Abhayagiri and the Jetavana (the largest stupa in the capital, and probably the largest in the Buddhist world at the time of construction).

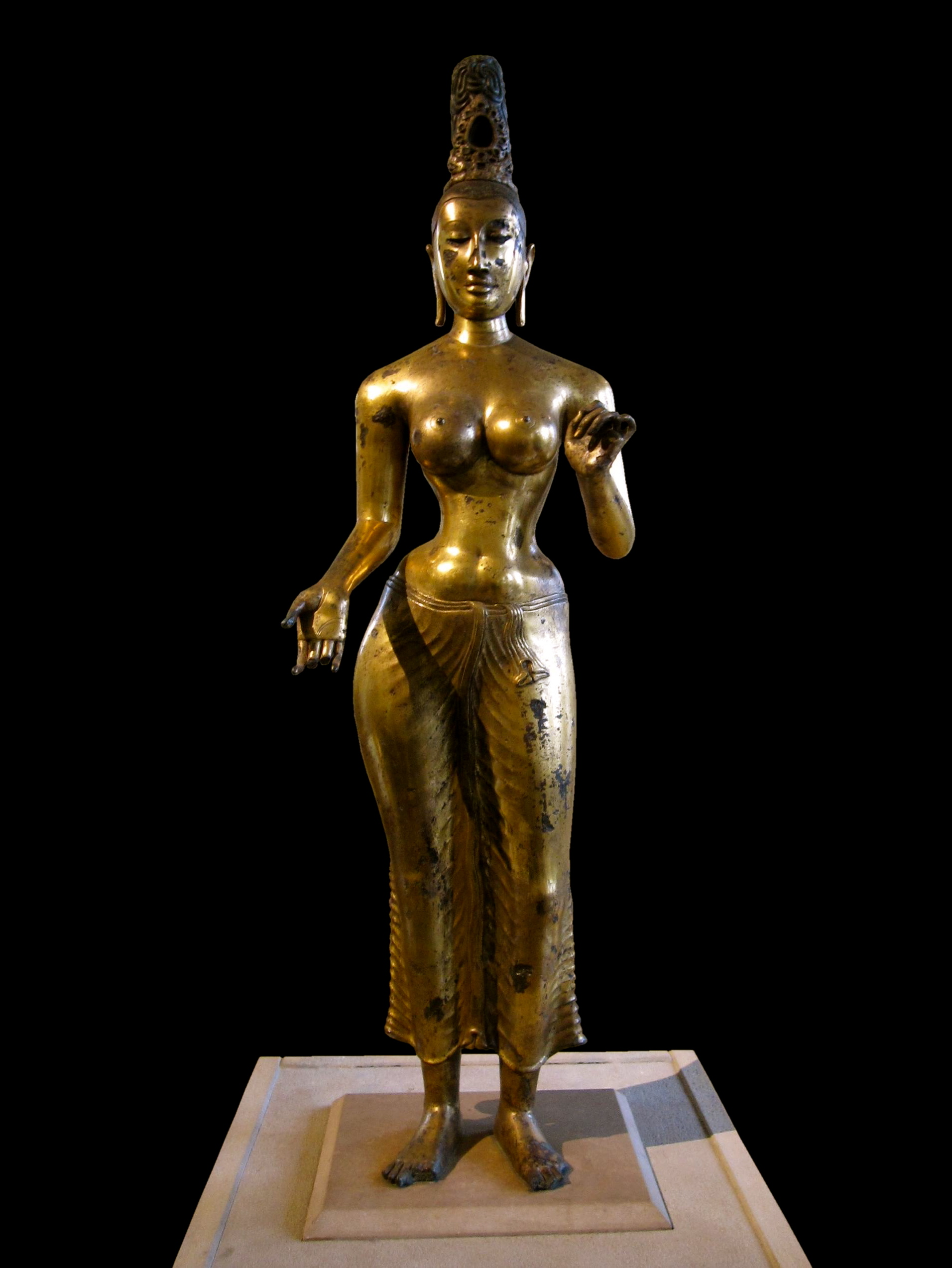
Gilded bronze statue of the Tara Bodhisattva, from the Anuradhapura period (8th century)

It is known that in the 8th century, both Mahāyāna and the esoteric Vajrayāna form of Buddhism were being practised in Sri Lanka, and two Indian monks responsible for propagating Esoteric Buddhism in China, Vajrabodhi and Amoghavajra, visited the island during this time.

Abhayagiri remained an influential centre for the study of Theravāda Mahāyāna and Vajrayāna thought from the reign of Gajabahu I until the 12th century. It saw various important Buddhist scholars working in both Sanskrit and Pāli. These include (possibly) Upatissa (who wrote the Vimuttimagga), Kavicakravarti Ananda (authored the Saddhammopåyana), Aryadeva, Aryasura, and the tantric masters Jayabhadra, and Candramåli.

==== Development of the Theravāda textual tradition ====
Sri Lankan (Sinhala) Buddhists initially preserved the Buddhist scriptures (the Tipitaka) orally, however, according to the Mahavamsa, during the first century BCE, destruction brought by the Beminitiyaseya led to the writing down of these scriptures to preserve them. The site of this event was at Aluvihāra temple. According to Richard Gombrich this is "the earliest record we have of Buddhist scriptures being committed to writing anywhere".

The surviving Pāli texts all derive from the Mahāvihāra tradition. While the other traditions like Abhayagiri no doubt had their own prolific literature, nothing of their work has survived in Pali.

Theravāda Buddhists also developed a series of scriptural commentaries (called the Atthakatha). The Theravāda tradition holds that a tradition of Indian commentaries on the scriptures existed even during Mahinda's early days. There were also various commentaries on the Tipitaka written in the Sinhala language, such as the Maha-atthakatha ("Great commentary"), the main commentary tradition of the Mahavihara monks, which is now lost. Furthermore, there were also Sinhala texts that were written to translate and explain the Pali Buddhist teachings to those who did not have knowledge of Pali. The Sinhala language thus developed during the Anuradhapura period under the influence of Pali (as well as Sanskrit and Tamil).

As a result of the work of later South Indian scholars who were associated with the Mahāvihāra, mainly Buddhaghosa (4th–5th century CE), Dhammapala and Buddhadatta, Sri Lankan Buddhists adopted Pali as their main scholastic language. This adoption of a lingua franca allowed the Sri Lankan tradition to become more international, allowing easier links with the community in South India and Southeast Asia.

These Mahāvihāra Theravāda monks also produced new Pāli literature such as historical chronicles, hagiographies, practice manuals, summaries, textbooks, poetry, and Abhidhamma texts. Buddhaghosa's work on Abhidhamma and Buddhist practice, such as his Visuddhimagga, remains the most influential texts of the modern Theravāda tradition apart from the Pāli Canon.

==== Warfare, decline and restoration of the sangha ====
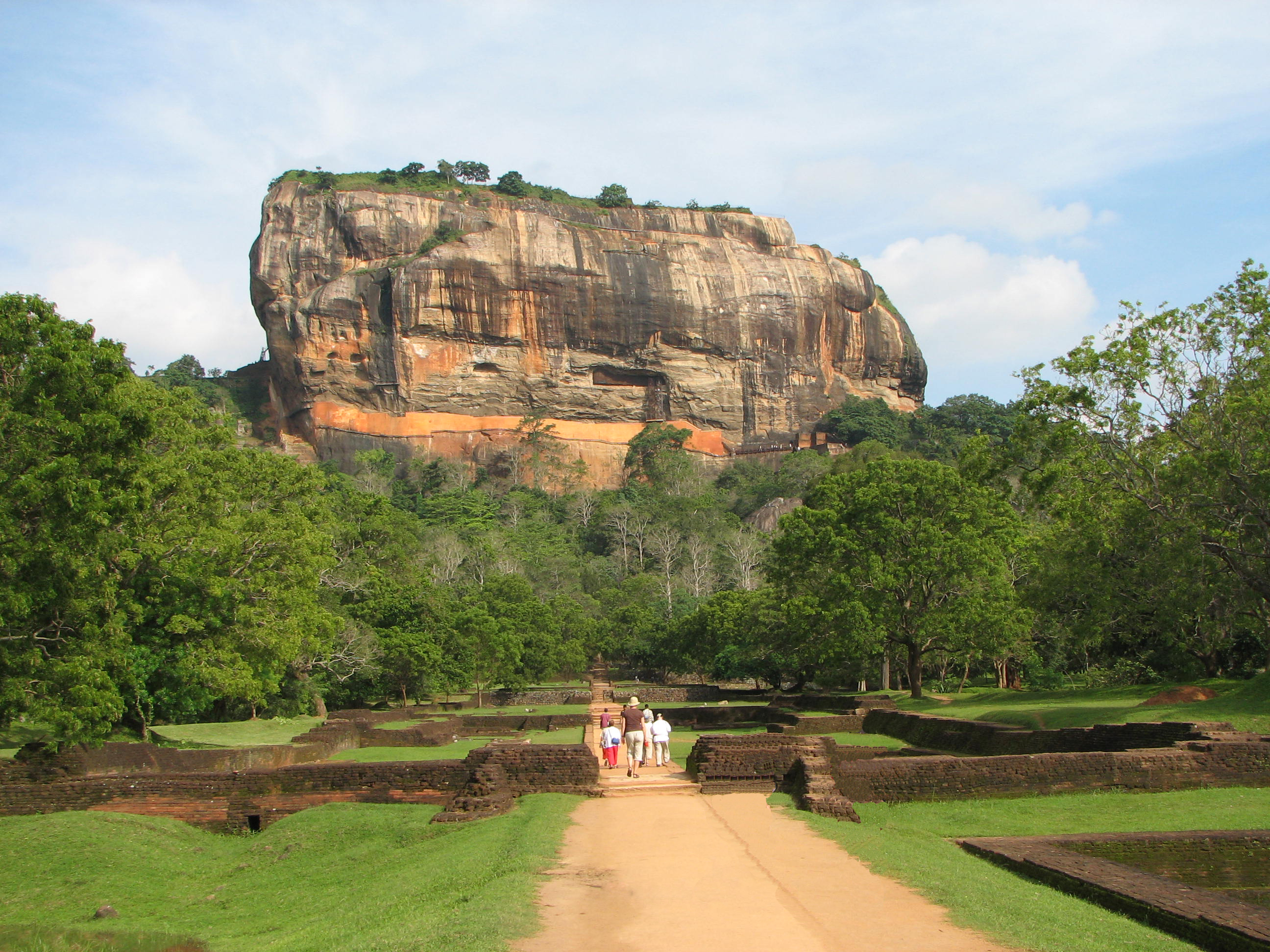
The Sigiriya ("Lion Rock"), a rock fortress and city, built by King Kashyapa (477 – 495 CE) as a new more defensible capital. It was also used as a Buddhist monastery after the capital was moved back to Anuradhapura.

From the 5th century (after the death of Mahanama in 428 CE) to the eleventh century, the island of Sri Lanka saw the weakening of royal Anuradhapura authority, continuous warfare between Sinhala kings, pretenders and foreign invaders from South Indian dynasties (the Cholas, Pallavas and Pandyas). These South Indian dynasties were strongly Hindu and often sought to eliminate Buddhist influence. In time, South Indian Buddhism was wiped out, and this severed a key cultural link between Sri Lanka and South India.

This era of the conflict saw the sacking of Buddhist monasteries and often made the situation difficult for Buddhism. However, in spite of the instability, this era also saw the expansion of Buddhist culture, arts and architecture. By the 9th century, Buddhist monasteries were powerful institutions that owned property, land, estates, and irrigation works. They had been granted these estates by kings and generally hold them in perpetuity. Buddhist monasteries at this stage of Sri Lankan history were basically self-sufficient economic units protected by the Sinhala kings. These Buddhist establishments were also often plundered during times of internal strife by Sinhala rulers competing among themselves, such as during the reigns of Dathopatissa I (639–650) and Kashyapa II (650–659).

Between the reigns of Sena I (833–853) and Mahinda IV (956–972), the city of Anuradhapura saw a "colossal building effort" by various kings during a period of peace and prosperity, the great part of the present architectural remains in this city date from this period. However, this was followed by the invasion and conquest of the Anuradhapura heartland by the Chola empire (between 993 and 1077), a war which devastated Anuradhapura and brought an end to the kingdom.

=== Polonnaruwa period (1017–1232) ===
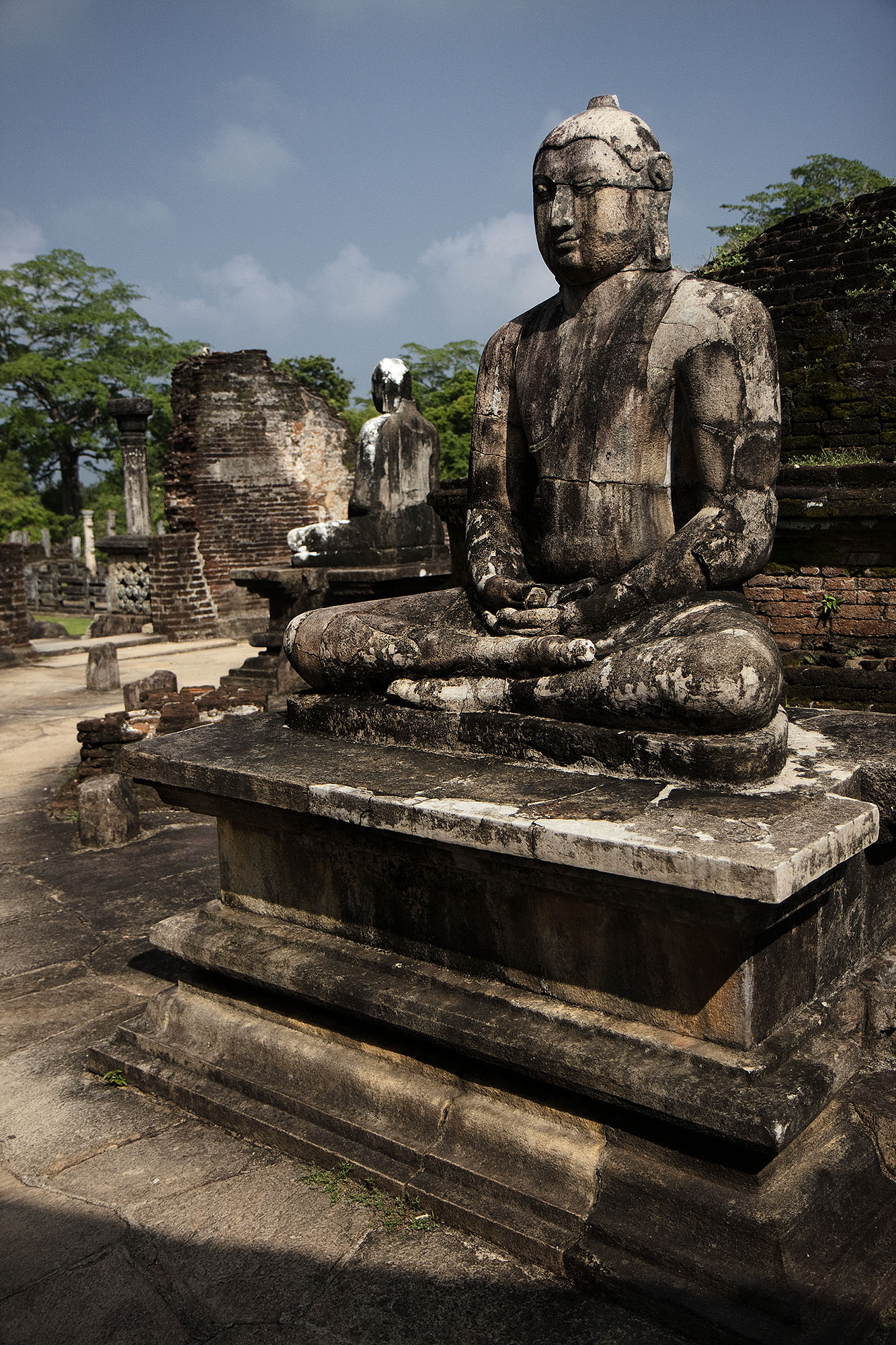
Buddha statues at Polonnaruwa.

During the Polonnaruwa period the Sinhalese in the south of the island (mainly the kingdom of Rohana) continued to resist, and the island was fully reconquered by Vijayabahu I (1055–1110) by 1070 who established the Kingdom of Polonnaruwa. The state of Sri Lankan Buddhism was so bad at this time that he could not find five bhikkhus in the whole island to ordain more monks and restore the monastic tradition; therefore, he sent an embassy to Burma, which sent back several eminent elders with Buddhist texts. Vijayabahu is also known for building the Temple of the Tooth.

The next influential figure in Sinhala Buddhism was Parākramabāhu I (1153–1186) who unified the island and set out to reform the Sri Lankan Buddhist sangha. De Silva notes that this significant reform event was traditionally seen as the triumph of the Mahāvihāra and the repression of the other schools, but that "recent research has shown this to be quite inaccurate." All Buddhist institutions had been severely damaged by the Hindu Cholas, and the three main traditions had fragmented into eight fraternities. Parākramabāhu united all of these into a common community, which seems to have been dominated by the Mahāvihāra but did not bring an end to sectarian competition completely.

Parākramabāhu seems to have seen the Sangha as being divided, corrupt and in need of reform, especially the Abhayagiri. The Cūḷavaṁsa states that Buddhist monastic communities were experiencing much conflict at this time. This chronicle also claims that many monks in the Sri Lankan Sangha had even begun to marry and have children, behaving more like lay followers than monastics. Parākramabāhu's chief monastic leader in these reforms was Mahathera Kassapa, an experienced monk well versed in the Suttas and Vinaya. According to some sources, some monks were defrocked and given the choice of either returning to the laity, or attempting re-ordination under the new unified Theravāda tradition as "novices" (sāmaṇera).

Parākramabāhu I is also known for rebuilding the ancient cities of Anuradhapura and Polonnaruwa, restoring Buddhist stupas and Viharas (monasteries). He appointed a Sangharaja, or "King of the Sangha", a monk who would preside over the Sangha and its ordinations in Sri Lanka, assisted by two deputies.

According to Alastair Gornall, the period between the 10th to 13th centuries saw a massive explosion in the composition of Pali literature. Part of the impulse behind these literary efforts was the fear that the Indian invasions and various wars on the island could lead to the decline of Buddhism. To prevent this, Pali authors of the reform era attempted to write works which would protect the essence (sara) of the Buddha's teaching.

This literature includes the work of prominent scholars such as Anuruddha, Sumangala, Siddhattha, Sāriputta Thera, Mahākassapa of Dimbulagala and Moggallana Thera. They worked on compiling subcommentaries to the Tipitaka, grammars, summaries and textbooks on Abhidhamma and Vinaya such as the influential Abhidhammattha-sangaha of Anuruddha. They also wrote kavya style Pali poetry and philological works. Their work owed much to the influence of Sanskrit grammar and poetics, particularly as interpreted by the Sri Lankan scholar Ratnamati. During this period, these new Pali doctrinal works also show an increasing awareness of topics found in Sanskrit Buddhist Mahayana literature.

During the Polonnaruva era, Theravāda also saw the increasing popularity of ārannavāsin (forest dweller) monks, who gained prominence in scholarship and took the lead in reform movements.

As the new Mahāvihāra Theravāda school became dominant in Sri Lanka, it gradually spread through mainland Southeast Asia. Theravāda established itself in Myanmar in the late 11th century, in Thailand in the 13th and early 14th centuries, and in Cambodia and Laos by the end of the 14th century. Although Mahavihara never completely replaced other schools in Southeast Asia, it received special favour at most royal courts. This is due to the support it received from local elites, who exerted a very strong religious and social influence.

=== Transitional period (1232–1592) ===
==== Fragmentation and decline ====
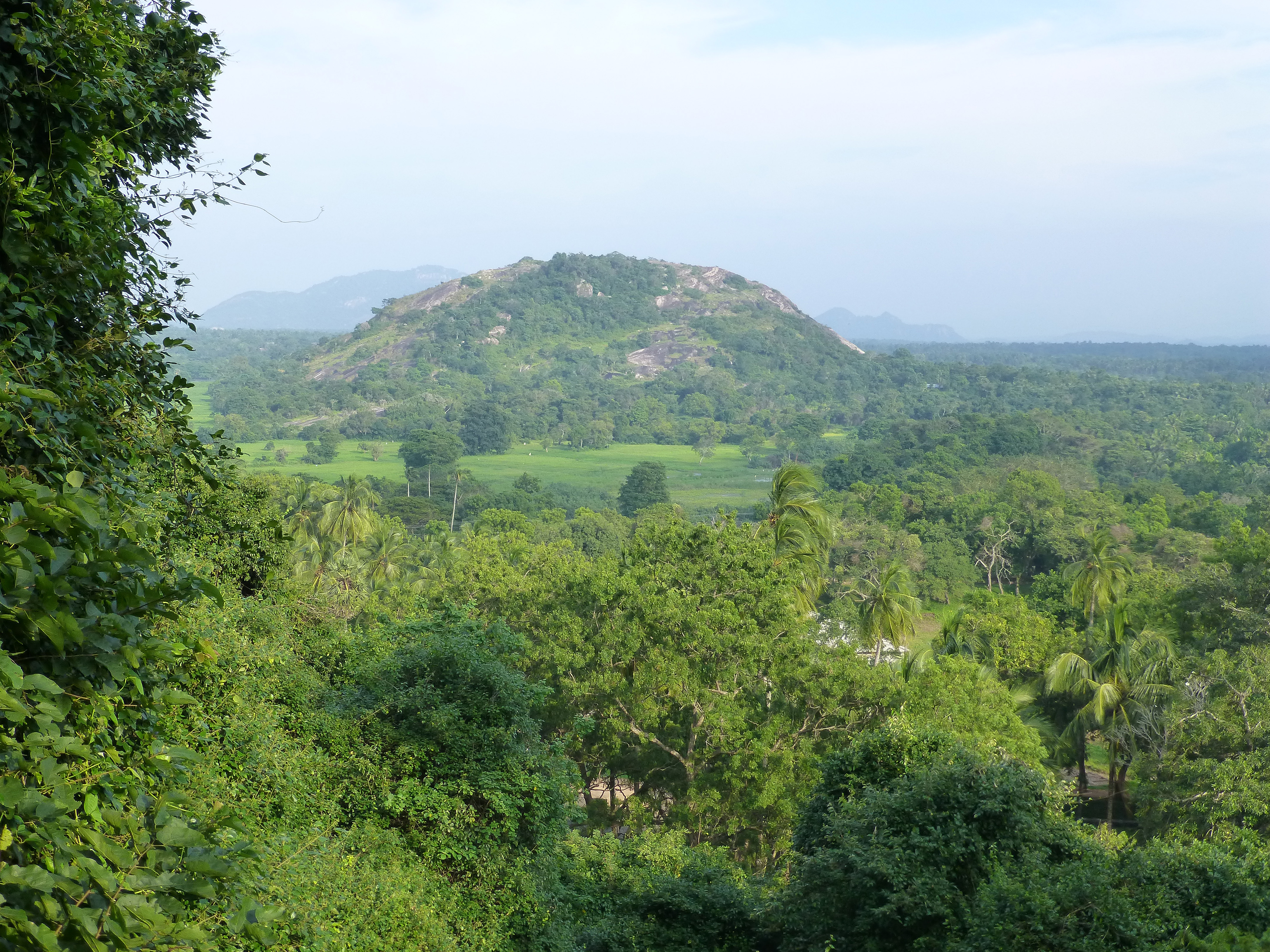
Yapahuwa, one of the Sinhala rock fortresses of this era. King Bhuvenakabahu fled here in 1272 with the tooth relic to escape invaders. It was later abandoned and became a home to Buddhist monks.

After the death of Parākramabāhu I, his realm disintegrated into warring factions, and South Indian invaders resumed their attacks on the island, eventually leading to the swift decline of the Polonnaruva kingdom. There was a brief period of rebuilding under Nissanka Malla, who promoted the building of great Buddhist centres at Nissanka Latha Mandapaya, Rankoth Vihara and Hatadage.

However, the kingdom continued to decline, under the attacks by South Indian states. The last Sinhala king to rule from Polonnaruva was Parākramabāhu III (1302–1310), who was actually a client king of the Pandyas and later had to retreat to Dambadeniya. After this, Sinhala kings were forced to retreat further to the south (to cities like Kurunagala and Gampola), mainly in search of security from South Indian states and from the expansive Tamil kingdom of Jaffna (a Hindu realm which now controlled the north-west of the island).

This instability also led to the decline of the discipline of the Sangha. Sinhala kings tried various measures to stem this decline, such as purging the sangha of undisciplined monks and introducing the post of sangharaja (chief of the sangha) under the Gampola kings. Regarding sectarian differences, these had mostly been worked out at this point in time, with the adoption of some Mahayana (as well as Hindu) deities and the rituals of the other sects into the Theravada orthodoxy. The cult of the tooth relic retained its importance for example. In spite of all the instability, Sri Lanka was seen by Buddhists in Southeast Asia as a new holy land, since it contained relics of the Buddha which were accessible, in contrast to India which had seen the disappearance of Buddhism and the Muslim invasions.

This period of the Dambadeniya kings also saw a flowering of religious poetry, such as the Kavsilumina, written by the king Parākramabāhu II in mahakavya style and the Saddharma Ratnavaliya (which retells stories of the Dhammapada commentary).

==== The influence of Mahāyāna ====
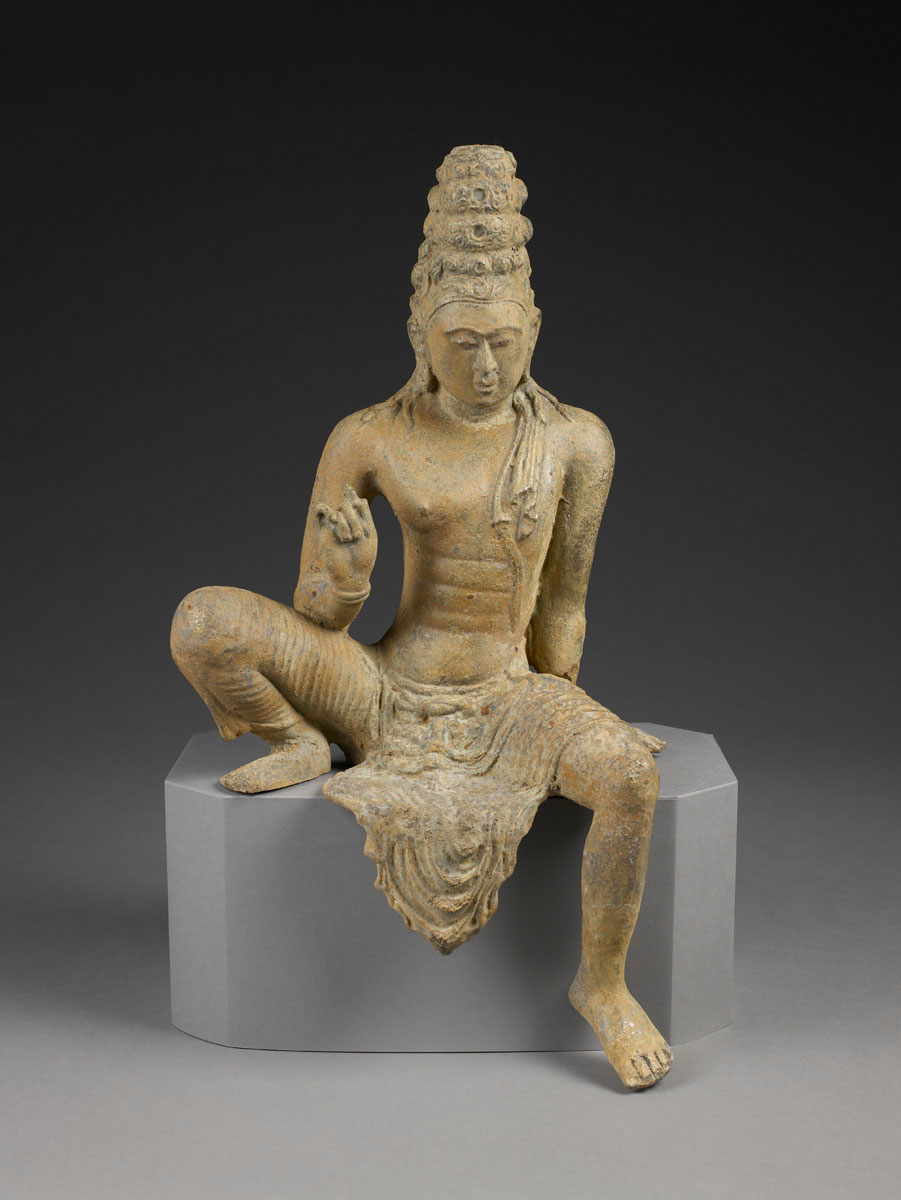
Bronze statue of Avalokiteśvara. Sri Lanka, c. 750.

Veneration of Avalokiteśvara (Lokeshwara Natha) has continued to the present day in Sri Lanka, where he is called Nātha. In more recent times, some western-educated Theravādins have attempted to identify Nātha with Maitreya. However, traditions and basic iconography, including an image of Amitābha on his crown, identify Nātha as Avalokiteśvara.

It is clear from sculptural evidence alone that the Mahāyāna was fairly widespread throughout [Sri Lanka], although the modern account of the history of Buddhism on the island presents an unbroken and pure lineage of Theravāda. (One can only assume that similar trends were transmitted to other parts of Southeast Asia with Sri Lankan ordination lineages.) Relics of an extensive cult of Avalokiteśvara can be seen in the present-day figure of Nātha.

Kings of Sri Lanka were often described as bodhisattvas, starting at least as early as Sirisanghabodhi (r. 247–249), who was styled a "mahāsatta" ("great being", Sanskrit mahāsattva), an epithet used almost exclusively in Mahayana. Many other Sri Lankan kings from the 3rd until the 15th century were also described as bodhisattvas and their royal duties were sometimes clearly associated with the practice of the ten pāramitās. In some cases, they explicitly claimed to have received predictions of Buddhahood in past lives.

=== Kandyan period (1592–1815) ===
==== European intervention and decline ====
During the beginning of the 16th century, Sri Lanka was fragmented into several kingdoms. The Portuguese Empire exploited this and established Colombo as a way to control the cinnamon trade. The Portuguese became drawn into various wars with these kingdoms. Between 1597 and 1658, a substantial part of the island came under Portuguese rule, though their control was rather tenuous and prone to rebellion. Only the kingdom of Kandy retained its independence.

The Portuguese sought to introduce Catholicism to the island, and in their wars, with the Sinhalese, they often destroyed Buddhist monasteries or handed them over to Catholic orders. From the 16th century onward, Christian missionaries attempted to convert the local population to Christianity. Non-Christian religions were suppressed and persecuted, while Christians were given preferential treatment. Over time, a Christian minority developed on the island. This war-torn period weakened the Buddhist Sangha so much, that in 1592, Vimaladharmasuriya I of Kandy sought aid from Burma to ordain Buddhist monks, as there was hardly a single properly ordained monk left.

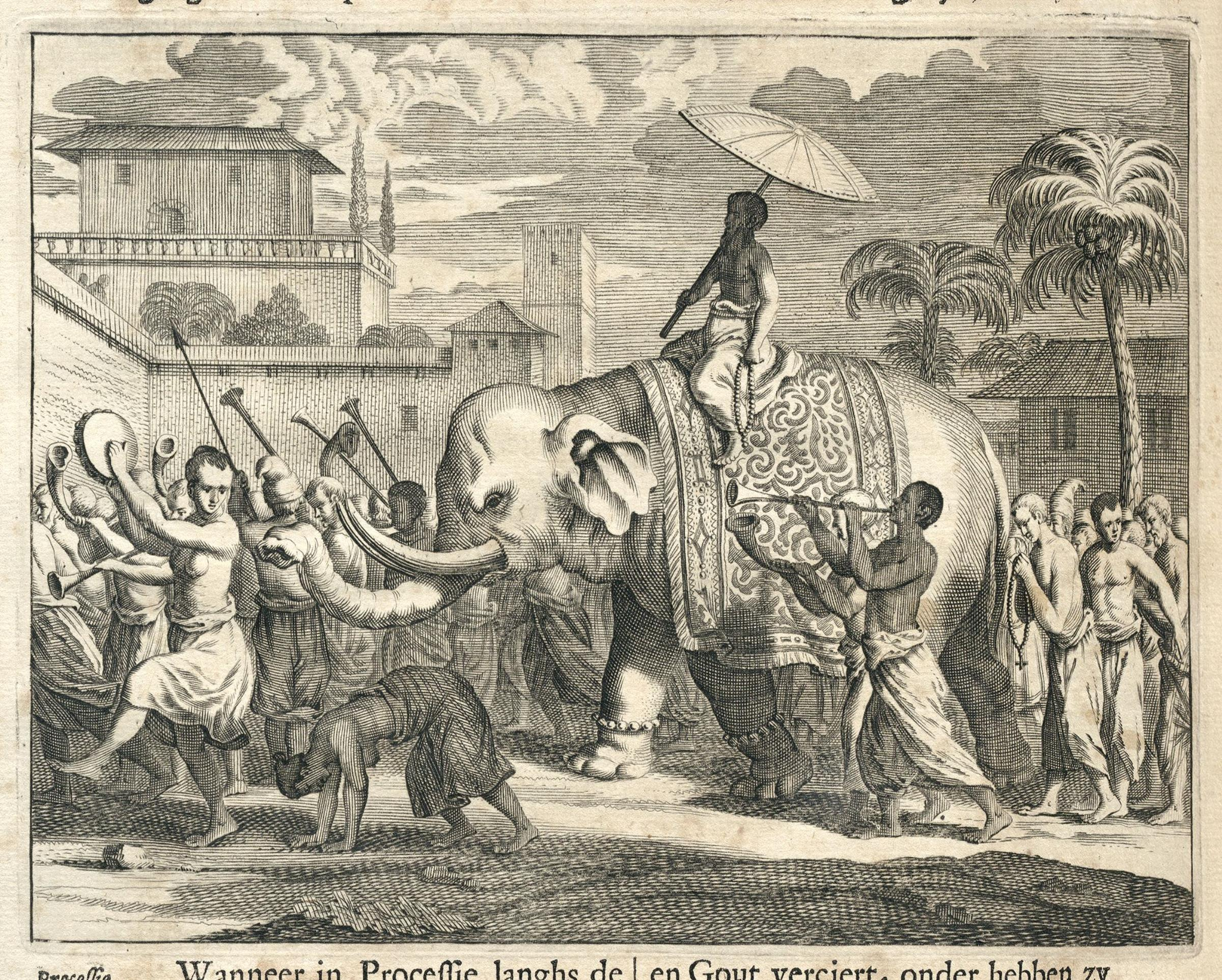
Dutch painting of a Buddhist religious festival in Ceylon, c. 1672

From 1612 to 1658, the Dutch and the Portuguese fought over the island, and Kandy sided with the Dutch. The Dutch won and occupied most of the coastal sections of the island (Dutch Ceylon, 1640–1796), while the kingdom of Kandy retained the interior. The Dutch were less zealous than the Portuguese in their religious proselytizing though they still discriminated against non-Christians (as well as Catholics). Non-Protestant worship was also not allowed in some towns, and Buddhist temple properties that had been confiscated by the Portuguese were not returned.

In the Kandyan kingdom of the interior, Buddhism remained the state religion. Kandyan rulers continued to patronize Buddhist institutions as the ancient Sinhala kings had done, and they remained in control of the tooth relic. Through much of the 18th century, however, the sangha was in a weakened state, with the ordination lineage broken. The Buddhist "priests" of the kingdom lacked the proper ordination rites (at least 5 fully ordained monks are required to fully ordain a new monk). These Buddhist religious figures who were not really proper monks ("bhikkhus"), but served a similar role to traditional monastics were called ganinnanses. Kandyan kings did attempt to re-establish the ordination lineage through their religious links to Burmese Buddhism, but these were not very successful.

The most successful attempt to revive the sangha was led by Weliwita Sri Saranankara Thero (1698–1778), who restored the higher ordination on the island by inviting monks from Thailand (thus founding the modern Siam Nikaya which survives to this day). With the support of the Kandyan king Kirti Sri Rajasinha, Weliwita also worked to establish the primacy of Buddhist ritual, and the modern form of the Festival of the Tooth Relic dates to this time. It was also during this period that Kirti Sri Rajasinha issued a decree stating that only those of the govigama caste could join the Siam Nikaya, and those non-govigama bhikkhus which did exist were exiled or prevented from participating in higher ordination.

The reigns of Kirti Sri Rajasinha (1747–1782) and Rajadhi Rajasinha (1782–1798) also saw the restoration of many Buddhist temples that had been destroyed in previous wars as the building of new temples (particularly in and around Kandy, such as Malvatta, Gangarama and Degaldoruva).

=== British Ceylon period (1815–1948) ===
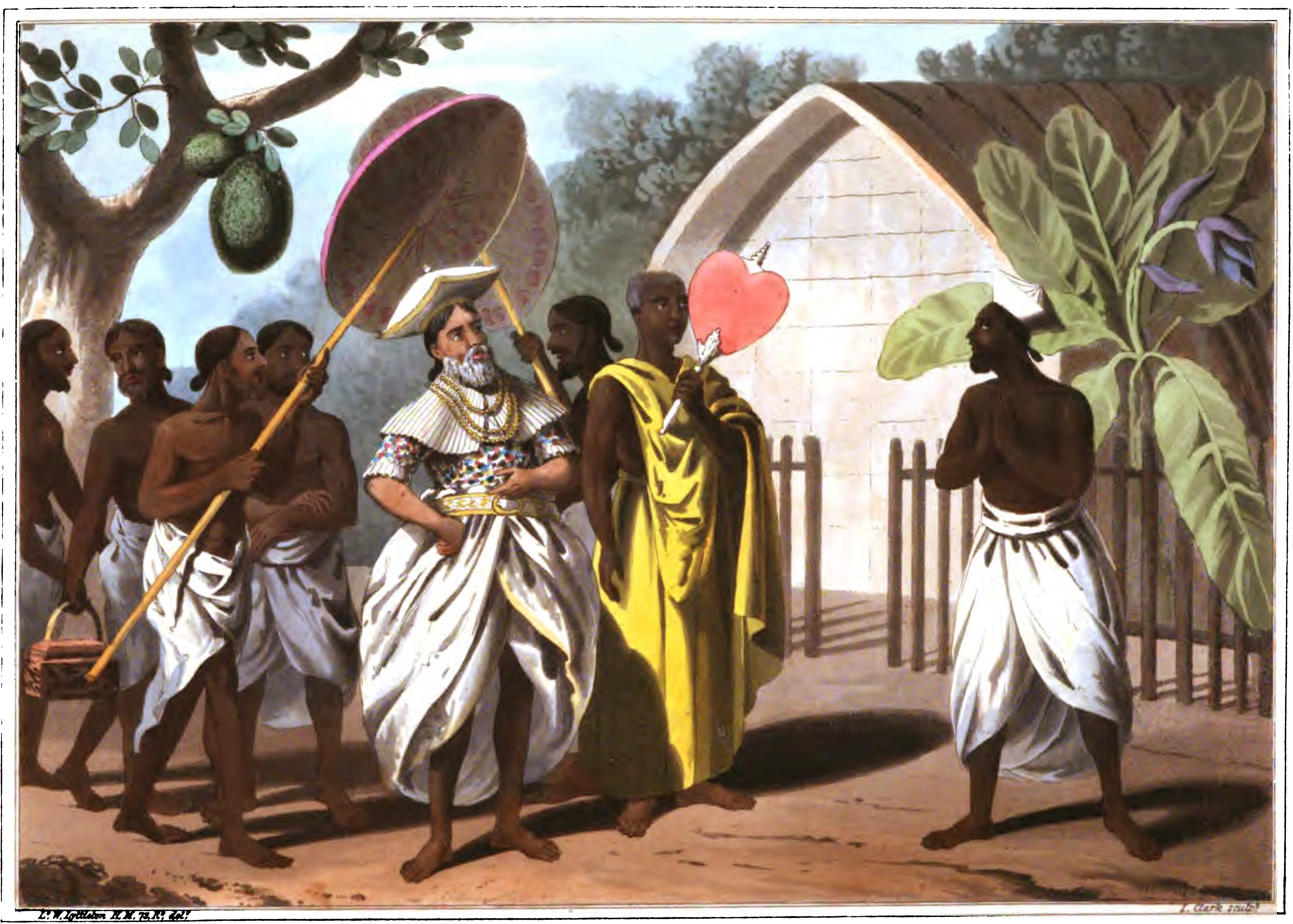
"A Kandyan Dissava and Priest of Boodhoo", illustration by John Davy (1821) of a native Kandyan chief/administrator and a Buddhist monk.

In 1795–1796, the Dutch territories in Sri Lanka came under the control of the British East India Company. In 1815 a British army conquered a politically divided Kandy and deposed the Sinhalese king. The British retained Sri Lanka until 1948 (though it remained a dominion until 1972). The initial treaty of surrender, the Kandyan Convention, stated that the Buddhist religion would be protected and maintained.

The first half of the 19th century saw the formation of a new monastic fraternity, the Amarapura Nikaya, by monks and would-be monks of non-govigama castes. They travelled to Burma in the first decade of the 19th century to bring back a new ordination which would not be restricted by caste. This new monastic order thrived in the littoral regions outside of Kandy and even made headways into Kandyan territory.

While the British government had a preference for Christians, they were not openly hostile to Buddhism, due to their fear that religious controversies might provoke political unrest. During the first two decades of British rule, there was no official British support for Christian missionary societies. Left to their own resources, the efforts of these missionary organizations made their progress in converting the population slowly, though they did grow. Their activities were also very restricted in the Kandyan regions. From the beginning, the missions used education as a means of evangelisation. Education in these schools (which disparaged Buddhism) was a requirement for government office. Christian missionaries also wrote tracts in Sinhalese attacking Buddhism and promoting Christianity.

After the 1830s, there was a period in which the British supported Christian missionary work much more actively. This was mainly due to the influence of pro-missionary politicians like Lord Glenelg and Governor Stewart Mackenzie (1837–41), as well as to the agitation of missionary agencies themselves. During this period, missionary organizations were the dominant influence in education, and it was believed that education should aim first and foremost to convert the local elites. Also during this time, the official association of the state with Buddhism was severed, in spite of a popular rebellion in 1848. However, the rebellion did cause the British government to become much more conservative in matters of religion and social change, and in the latter half of the 19th century it backed away from its support of missionary efforts they felt would anger the Sinhalese.

==== The Buddhist revival ====
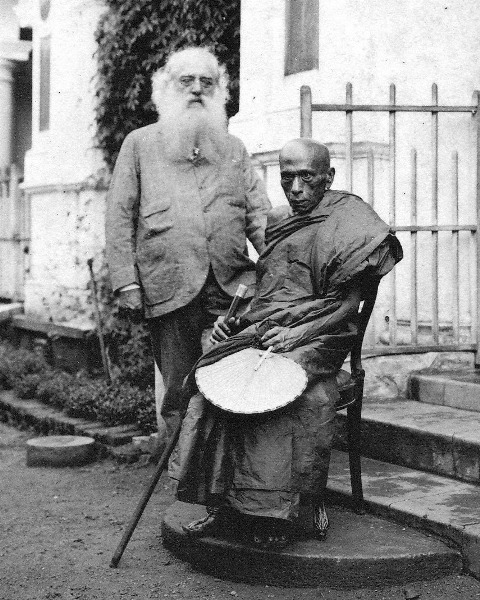
Hikkaduwe Sri Sumangala Thera, an important Buddhist scholar of the revival with Colonel Henry Steel Olcott.

In the second half of the 19th century, a national Buddhist revival movement began as a response to Christian missionaries and British colonial rule. This movement was empowered by the results of several public debates between Christian priests and Buddhist monks such as Migettuwatte Gunananda Thera and Hikkaduwe Sri Sumangala Thera. The big five public debates with Protestant missionaries were held in 1865 (the Baddegama and Waragoda debates), 1866 (Udanwita debate), 1871 (Gampola debate), and 1873 (Panadura debate). Topics of the debates included God, the Soul, the resurrection, Karma, Rebirth, Nirvana and the principle of dependent origination. One of these debates, the famed "Panadura debate" of 1873 was widely seen as a victory for Gunananda Thera.

The British government, weary of religious conflict, largely attempted a policy of religious neutrality at this time. During this period, Buddhists formed societies (such as the Society for the Propagation of Buddhism) and centres of learning (Vidyodaya Pirivena and Vidyalankara Pirivena) to promote Buddhism and to print Buddhist literature. A new monastic fraternity was also formed, the Ramanna Nikaya (which split off from the Amarapura Nikaya), which stressed monastic discipline. Indeed, the revival movement was mainly led by these two Nikayas, and the Siam Nikaya in Kandy largely remained uninvolved. During this time the first Buddhist school in Sri Lanka, 'Jinalabdhi Vishodaka' was founded in 1869 and its founder was Sri Piyaratana Tissa Mahanayake Thero

In 1880 Henry Steel Olcott arrived in Sri Lanka with Madame Blavatsky of the Theosophical Society, causing much excitement on the island. He had been inspired when he read about the Panadura debate and had exchanged letters with Gunananda. After learning about Buddhism from monks such as Sumangala Thera, Olcott converted to the religion. Olcott and the Sinhalese Buddhist leaders established the Buddhist Theosophical Society in 1880, with the goal of establishing Buddhist schools (there were only three at the time, by 1940, there were 429 Buddhist schools on the island). He sponsored Buddhist colleges such as Ananda College in Colombo and the Dharmaraja College in Kandy. Olcott also collected the Buddhist scriptures which had been translated by Western Indologists and based on these, he composed a 'Buddhist Catechism' (1881), which promoted Buddhism as a 'scientific religion' and was used in Buddhist schools until the late 20th century.

The Sri Lankan Theosophical society under Olcott also had its own publications to promote Buddhism; the Sinhalese newspaper, Sarasavisandarasa, and its English counterpart, The Buddhist. As a result of their efforts, Vesak became a public holiday, Buddhist registrars of marriage were allowed, and interest in Buddhism increased. Olcott was also part of the committee which designed the new Buddhist flag. The presence of a group of westerners who championed Buddhism also had an energizing effect on the sangha.

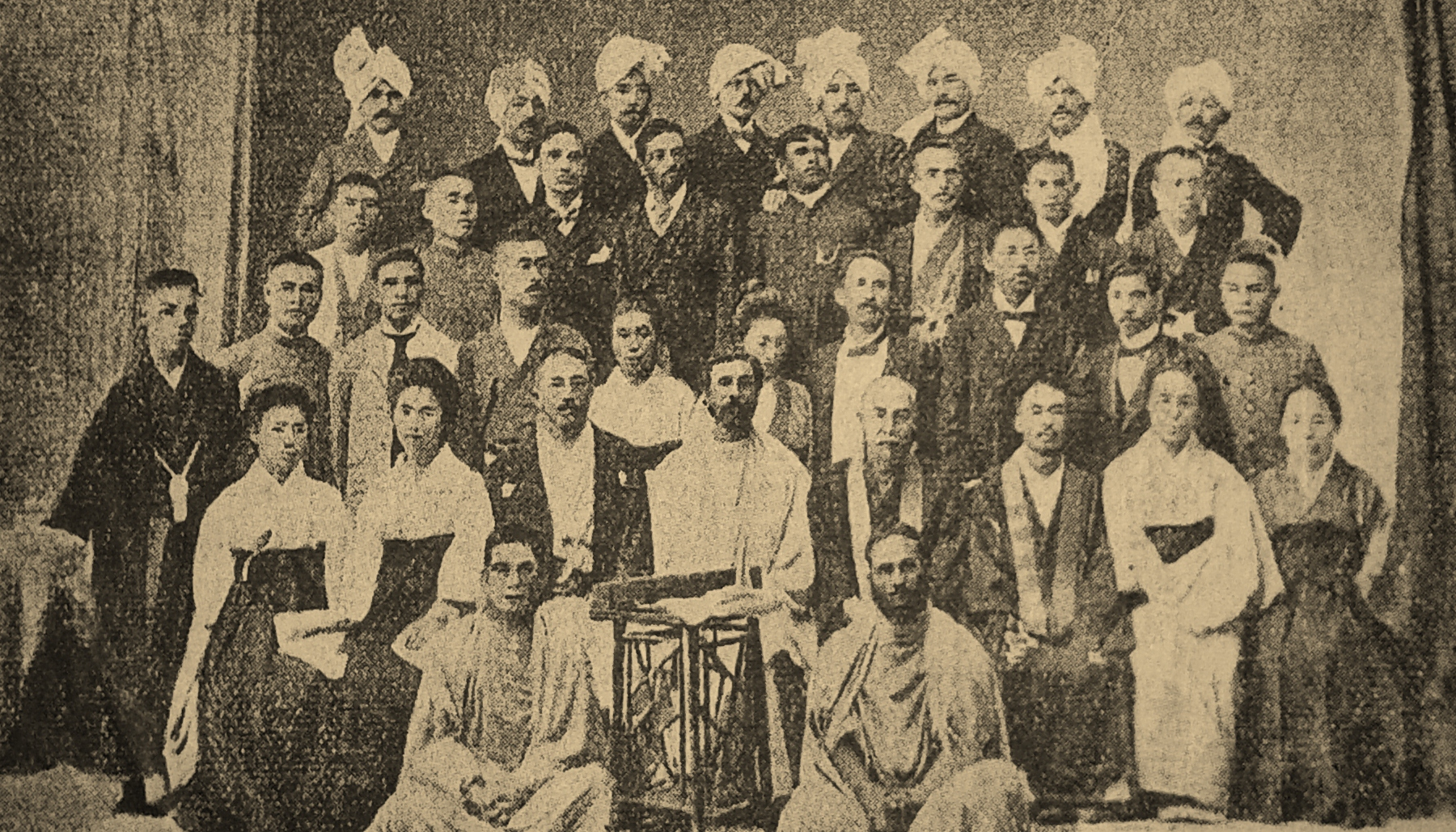
Dharmapala (seated centre) with other international members of the Mahabodhi Society, Calcutta

Another important figure in the revival is Anagarika Dharmapala, initially an interpreter for Olcott, he then travelled around the world preaching Buddhism and associating with clerics, Theosophists, scholars, elites and other interested folks. In Sri Lanka, he preached Buddhism, gave speeches and led the establishment of numerous Buddhist schools, hospitals, seminaries and the Buddhist newspaper Sinhala Bauddhaya (in which he wrote a regular weekly column).

After visiting India, he established the pan-Buddhist Maha Bodhi Society in 1891 whose goal was to revive Buddhism in India, and restore the ancient Buddhist shrines at Bodh Gaya, Sarnath and Kushinara. The society also sought to create a universal network of Buddhists around the world and unite the Buddhist world. Dharmapala also represented Theravada Buddhism as a world religion at the World's Parliament of Religions of 1893.

A key element of the Buddhist revival was a strong nationalist anti-colonial stance mixed with a sense of Buddhist internationalism. In spite of its strong anti-Christian missionary stance, the Buddhist revival has been described as a "Protestant Buddhism" (but more commonly "Buddhist modernism") due to how similar the tactics, ideas and organizational forms were to modern Protestant Christianity.

Another key element of the revival was a temperance movement (that also included Sri Lankan Christians), which established numerous temperance societies, similar to the Christian temperance societies. Many of the figures associated with the revival and with the temperance movement were also closely associated with the nationalist independence movement in the early 20th century. The most famous of which is Anagarika Dharmapala, but also includes the Senanayake brothers, mainly F. R. Senanayake, D. C. Senanayake and D. S. Senanayake as well as D. B. Jayatilaka.

==== Modern Buddhist literature and spread to the West ====
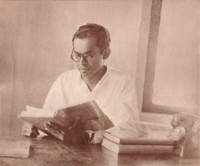
Asoka Weeraratna

The associations of the Buddhist revival also contributed much to the publication of Buddhist literature, and the promotion of Buddhist scholarship. Revivalist Buddhist scholars include Sir D. B. Jayatilaka, F. R. Senanayake, Walisinghe Harischandra and W. A. de Silva. During the revival, journalism was a major arena for religious discussion and debate. English as well as Sinhala were used in this new journalism. The works of the novelists Piyadasa Sirisena and Martin Wickramasinghe are examples of the Buddhist nationalist-influenced literature of the 20th century.

The Buddhist revival also resulted in the spreading of Buddhism in Western countries. Anagarika Dharmapala and Asoka Weeraratna pioneered the establishment of Buddhist Viharas in Europe. Anagarika Dharmapala founded the London Buddhist Vihara in 1926 while Asoka Weeraratna opened a new chapter for the spread of Buddhism in Germany and Europe by establishing the first Buddhist Vihara in Continental Europe, Dr. Paul Dahlke's Das Buddhistische Haus in 1957. He also founded the German Dharmaduta Society. Monks from Sri Lanka were also sent to live in Germany to spread the Dhamma. Asoka also founded the influential meditation monastery Nissarana Vanaya.

Since the Buddhist revival, Sri Lanka has also been an important centre of Buddhist scholarship in Western languages. One of the first western bhikkhus, the German Nyanatiloka Mahathera, studied in Sri Lanka, established the Island Hermitage there and ordained several western monks. Western monks who studied in the island hermitage such as Nanamoli Bhikkhu and Ven. Nyanaponika (who worked in the Buddhist Publication Society along with Bhikkhu Bodhi) were responsible for many important translations of the Pali Canon and other texts on Buddhism into English and German.

=== Sri Lanka since 1948 ===
In 1948 Sri Lanka was granted self-rule (though it remained a Dominion of the British Empire until 1972) in a peaceful transfer of power. The negotiations with the British were led by D.S. Senanayake, the first prime minister of Sri Lanka who strongly believed in achieving independence through legal and constitutional means.

Senanayake's UNP and his opponents in the left-wing parties all promoted the idea of Sri Lanka as a secular state with a plural multi-racial society. This alienated some of the ethnic Sinhalese Buddhist nationalists who believed Buddhism should have the status of state religion (which it had historically enjoyed) and that Sinhala should be the sole national language (this was seen as an equally important element of Sinhalese Buddhist culture). These nationalists were influenced by the idea (first articulated by Anagarika Dharmapala) that Sri Lanka was the holy land of Buddhism (the "Island of Dhamma", Dhammadipa) and that the Sinhalese were the noble protectors of Buddhism, while all other foreigners on the island were a corrupting and dangerous influence. The nationalists also saw the UNP elite as alienated from traditional Sinhalese culture. These Buddhist ethno-nationalists were consolidated under S. W. R. D. Bandaranaike's Freedom Party (SLFP), which defeated the UNP in 1956 on a nationalist and anti-Tamil platform.

From the point of view of Buddhist monastics, the idea that Buddhist monks should be involved in politics was vigorously defended by the followers of Anagarika Dharmapala, and by monks such as Walpola Rahula, who wrote an influential book called Bhiksuvage Urumaya (The Heritage of the Bhikkhu) in 1946 defending the idea. Rahula draws from the Mahavamsa to argue that the Sinhala Buddhist monk had always been socio-politically engaged (in the past, this meant close ties with kings). He defends the politically engaged monk and argues that they are nobler and more righteous than the forest hermit. Some Buddhists did not adopt a nationalist politics and instead adopted Socialism, seeing capitalism as a Western corruption. This Buddhist Socialism was most strongly defended by D. C. Vijayavardhana, in a book titled Dhamma Vijaya (the Revolt in the Temple).

With the support of Buddhist nationalists, the SLFP introduced and eventually passed the divisive Sinhala Only Act, which made Sinhala the only official language of the nation. This alienated many minorities like the Sri Lankan Tamils in the process, who sought regional autonomy. Under Sirimavo Bandaranaike (the world's first female prime minister), the Freedom Party also nationalised most schools in the country that received government aid (a few Catholic schools were fully privatized to avoid this fate). This was particularly resisted by the Catholic minority who ran a widespread system of mission schools (which was considered by the Buddhist nationalists as part of the legacy of colonialism).

After these events, the support of the Buddhist sangha became indispensable for both the UNP and the Freedom Party (SLFP). They both adopted Buddhist symbolism at public functions and promoted Buddhist activities. The government also promoted the restoration of Buddhist archaeological sites, such as Anuradhapura.

In 1972, a new constitution was adopted, supported by the Buddhist nationalists, which gave Buddhism a "foremost place" in the eyes of the state. The '72 constitution (as well as the current constitution which replaced it in '78) made it a duty of the state to "protect and foster Buddhism". Further repressive government policies against the Tamils lead to increasing separatist sentiment and radicalization, culminating with the formation of the Tamil Tigers. The tensions between Tamil separatists (who sometimes resorted to terrorist activities) and the Sinhalese (who in response became more authoritarian or resorted to mob violence) culminated in the Sri Lankan Civil War. The war lasted 25 years, from 1983 to the final defeat of the Tamil Tigers in 2009. The Tigers also attacked Buddhist monasteries and monks, including at famed sites such as Sri Mahabodhi in Anuradhapura (in 1984) and the Temple of the Tooth (in 1998). Sinhalese forces responded with similar attacks on Tamil religious sites (as well as on Christian and Muslim places of worship).

==== Militant Buddhist Nationalism ====
According to Peter Lehr, militant ultra-nationalist Buddhism has been on the rise in Sri Lanka since the 50s. According to Lehr, this is partially fueled by "the impression that Buddhism is under siege by a hostile non-Buddhist enemy," which has led many Sinhala Buddhists to see themselves as a minority under siege by external forces. The influences on this militancy include Anagarika Dharmapala, who had also spoken of Muslims as a dangerous "barbarous race", who wiped out Buddhism in India and had often preached against Christianity.

This militant nationalism has been taken up by certain extremist figures, in spite of the fact that mainstream Buddhist teachings are unambiguous regarding the prohibition of monastic violence (which is punishable by expulsion from the monastic community) and promote non-violence as a virtue for laypersons to aspire to as well. Buddhist scholars generally see the doctrine of Theravada Buddhism as promoting loving-kindness in all circumstances, even in the face of oppression or terrorism.

However, some Buddhist nationalists have promoted the use of violence in defense of Buddhism and the nation. In this, they could draw on old Buddhist traditions, such as those of the Sinhala kings found in the Mahavamsa. One particular episode in the Mahavamsa involving the warrior king Dutugāmunu seems to allow for killing one's enemies as long as one is acting with the intention to defend the Buddhist religion.

One of the most infamous acts of this extremist Buddhist nationalism was the assassination of Sri Lankan Prime Minister Solomon Bandaranaike by the Buddhist monk Talduwe Somarama (he was backed by another monk, Mapitigama Buddharakkitha) in 1959. The assassination was caused by Bandaranaike's attempts to compromise with the Tamils.

More recent militant figures include Gangodawila Soma Thero and Inamaluwe Sri Sumangala Thero, both of whom regularly preached the idea that the nation was under siege by other religions, especially Muslims. The Jathika Hela Urumaya political party is a Buddhist nationalist political party partly founded and led by "war monks" such as Athuraliye Rathana Thero, who demanded, among other things, that the Tamil Tigers be wiped out, that peace negotiations with them be stopped, and that conversions from Buddhism be banned. Another militant Buddhist nationalist, Inamaluwe Sri Sumangala Thero, has stated that Muslims are "an inhumane/animal-like race of people."

Proselytizing from Buddhism has been illegal in Sri Lanka since 2009, due to the increase in conversions to Protestantism, however converting into Buddhism is highly encouraged by the government to be considered a person of Sinhalese origin.

The Bodu Bala Sena ('Buddhist Power Force'), is another extremist Buddhist nationalist group in Sri Lanka who, in response to the killing of a Buddhist monk, organized anti-Muslim rallies that led to the anti-Muslim riots of 15–17 June 2014. One of the leading BBS monks, Galagoda Aththe Gnanasara, has given speeches inciting violence against Muslims and was even arrested and sentenced in 2018 for his issuing personal threats. The BBS also targets Sinhalese Buddhists who criticize them. One such figure is Watareka Vijitha Thera, the secretary general of the Jathika Bala Sena (National Power Force, JBS) which promotes peace and co-existence. Watareka Vijitha has been targeted by BBS, been called a traitor and has been physically assaulted. However, according to Lehr the majority of Sinhalese monks remain strictly apolitical and "also rather silent on all things political—which also includes the choice of not commenting on the activities of the politically active ones." Further anti-Muslim riots have recently rocked the island, in 2018 and 2019.

==== The Forest Movement ====
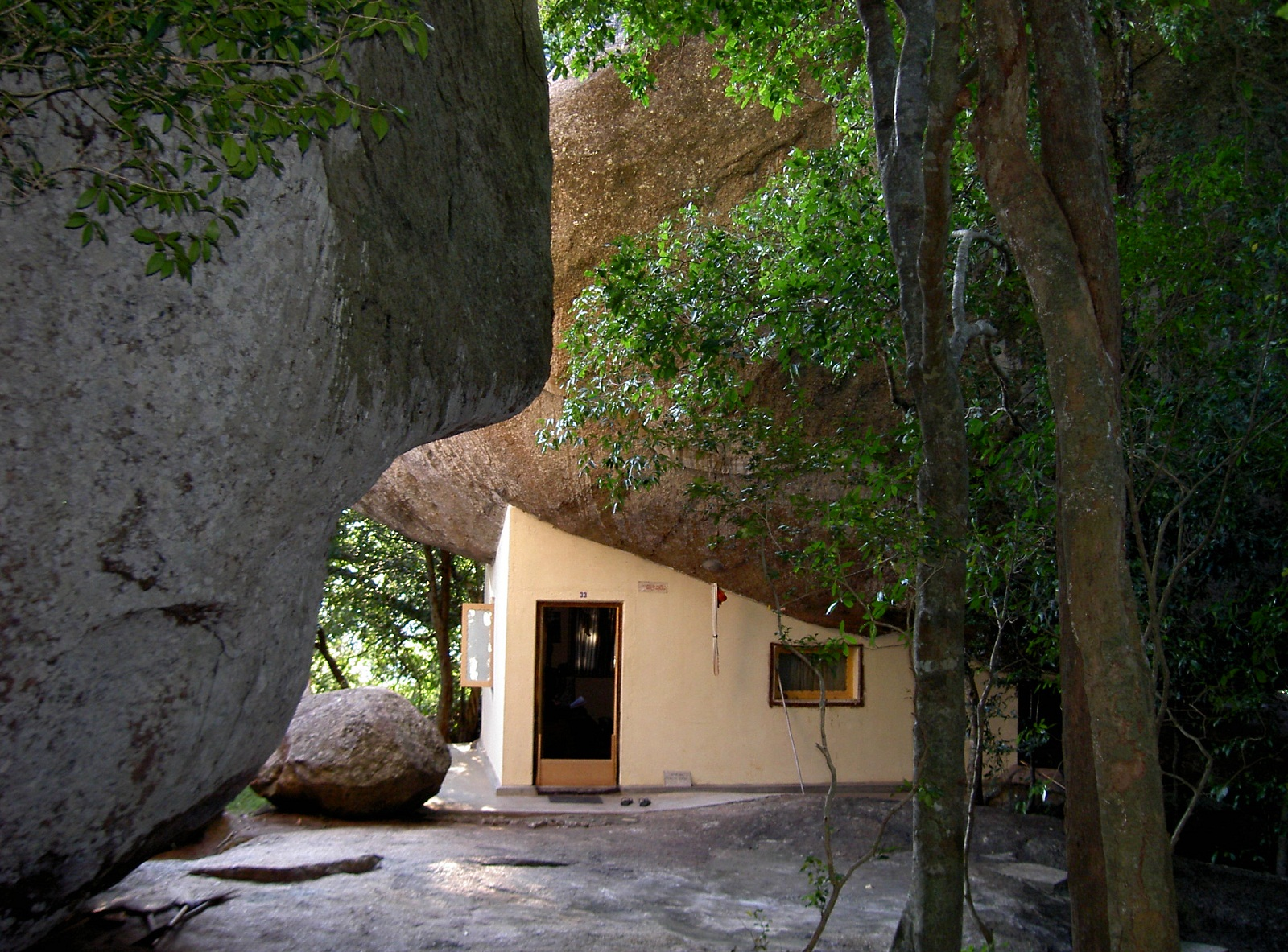
A kuti (monk's hut) at Nā Uyana Aranya forest monastery

From the 1950s onwards, a Sri Lankan Forest Tradition has been in development, focusing on renunciation, meditation and forest dwelling. In 1973, Carrithers' study of the movement reported over 150 hermitages with around 600 monks. Though most of the currently occupied forest monasteries were built after the 50s, the modern Sri Lankan Forest Monasticism movement goes back to the 19th century. Puvakdandave Paññānanda (1817–1887) was one of the first monks to establish forest hermitages that remain occupied today (Batuvita and Kirinda).

Some key figures in the 20th century include Kadavadduve Jinavaṃsa, Vaturuvila Ñāṇananda, and Kukulnape Devarakkhita. These forest monks sought to reform the sangha by returning to the forest life and strictly following the Vinaya (ancient monastic rule). Jinavamsa along with Matara Sri Ñāṇārāma founded the Śrī Kalyāṇī Yogāśrama Sansthā, an association of forest meditation hermitages such as Nissarana Vanaya and Nā Uyana Aranya. This movement also produced excellent scholar philosophers, such as Kaṭukurunde Ñāṇananda.

==== Bhikkhuni ordination re-establishment ====
A few years after the arrival of Mahinda, Bhikkhunī Sanghamitta, who is also believed to be the daughter of Emperor Ashoka came to Sri Lanka. She started the first nun's order in Sri Lanka, but this order of nuns died out in Sri Lanka in the 11th century.

Many women have been ordained in Sri Lanka since 1996. In 1996 through the efforts of Sakyadhita, an International Buddhist Women Association, Theravada bhikkhuni order was revived when 11 Sri Lankan women received full ordination in Sarnath, India, in a procedure held by Ven. Dodangoda Revata Mahāthera and the late Ven. Mapalagama Vipulasāra Mahāthera of the Mahābodhi Society in India with assistance from monks and nuns of Korean Chogyo order. Some bhikkhuni ordinations were carried out with the assistance of nuns from the East Asian tradition; others were carried out by the Theravada monk's Order alone. Since 2005, many ordination ceremonies for women have been organized by the head of the Dambulla chapter of the Siyam Nikaya in Sri Lanka.However, since the higher bhikkhu leaders in Sri Lanka and other Theravada Buddhist countries have concluded that it is contrary to Buddhist discipline. Therefore, Sri Lanka and other Theravada Buddhist countries do not accept that Bhikkhuni Ordination.Although women are not eligible for ordination, they are able to live their monastic life in other ways, such as the Ten Precepts Angarika nuns.

== Buddhist organizations ==
=== Monastic groups ===
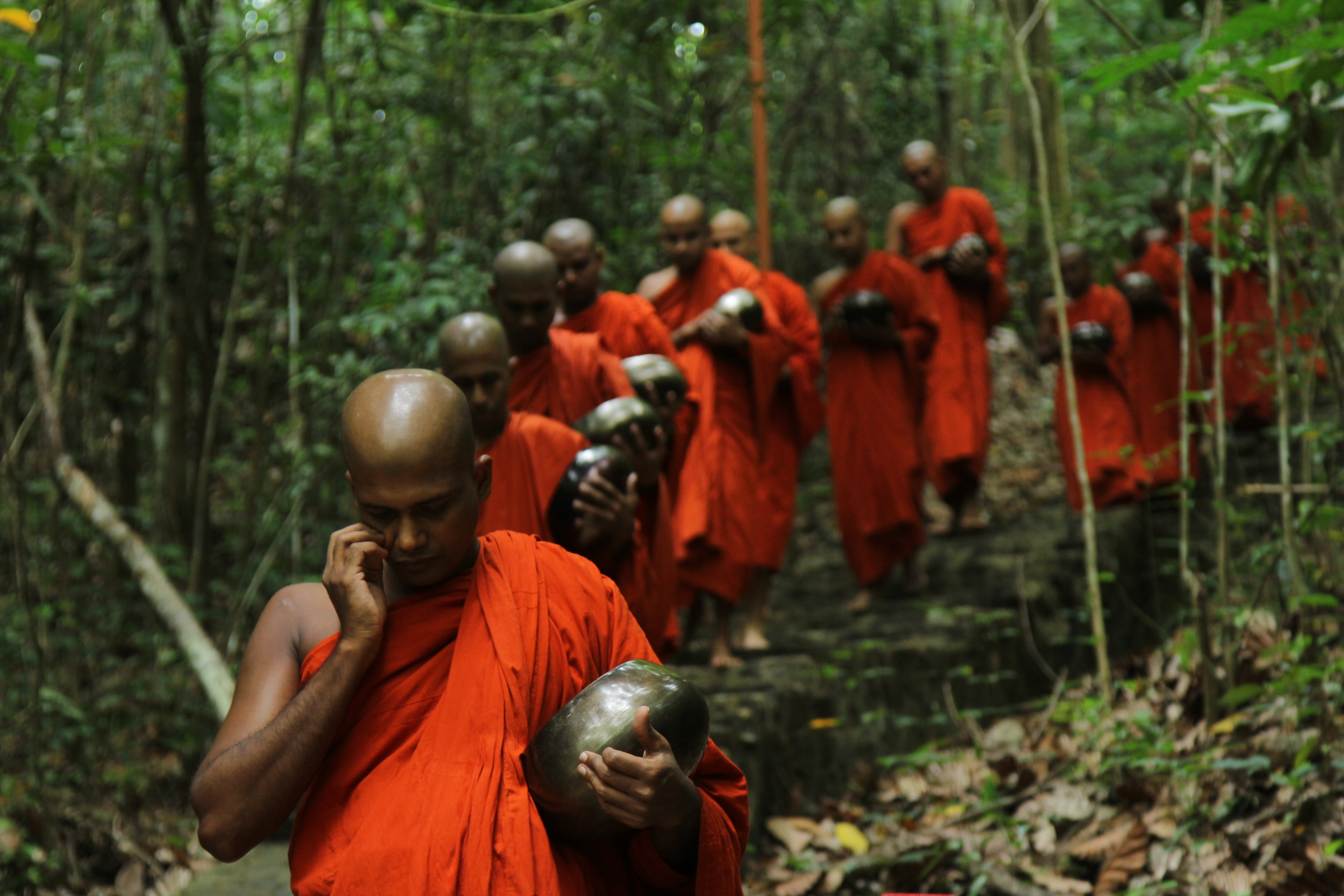
Sinhalese Forest Tradition Buddhist monks at Mahamevnawa Maha Vihara, Matara

The different sects of the Sri Lankan (Sinhala) Buddhist sangha are referred to as Nikayas. There are currently two main Nikayas on the island:

- Siam Nikaya, founded in the 18th century by monks from Thailand. This Nikaya only allows higher ordination from the Radala and Govigama castes. They maintain the Temple of the Tooth in Kandy.
- Amarapura-Rāmañña Nikāya – Formed in 2019 as a merger of the Amarapura Nikaya (founded in 1800 through Burmese monastics) and the Rāmañña Nikaya (founded in 1864). It is the largest Nikaya on the island. This tradition allows all to ordain as monks, regardless of caste.

There are numerous sub-divisions in these main ordination lineages.

=== Other organizations ===
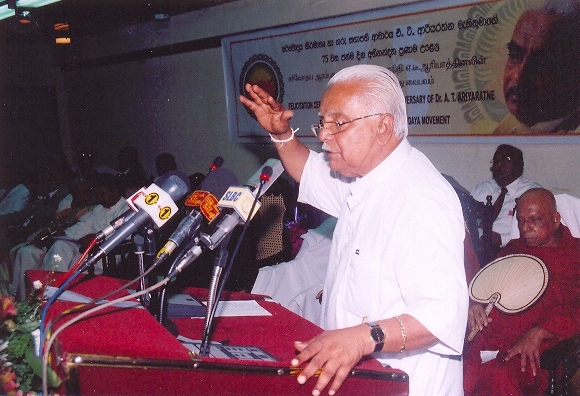
A. T. Ariyaratne

Besides the monastic fraternities, there are various Buddhist institutions and organizations in Sri Lanka. Some of these include:

- Young Men's Buddhist Association, a Buddhist version of the YMCA
- All Ceylon Buddhist Women's Association
- Sri Lanka Maha Bodhi Society with close ties to the Indian Buddhist sites.
- Buddhist Publication Society, which publishes Buddhist literature in English and Sinhala.
- The Buddhist (TV channel)
- The Sarvodaya Shramadana Movement of A. T. Ariyaratne, a welfare and conflict resolution organization.
- Sarvodaya Shanthi Sena Sandasaya or Shanthi Sena (Peace Brigade), an organization focused on peace work founded by A. T. Ariyaratne
- Jathika Hela Urumaya, a nationalist political party which includes Buddhist monks in its ranks.
- Bodu Bala Sena, (Buddhist Power Force or BBS), a Sinhalese nationalist organization known to perpetrate attacks on Sri Lankan Muslims. It has been called an extremist group by Sri Lankan politicians like Mangala Samaraweera and Vasudeva Nanayakkara.

== Demographics ==
Buddhism in Sri Lanka is predominantly practised by the Sinhalese people, however the 2012 Sri Lanka Census revealed a Buddhist population of 22,254 amongst the Sri Lankan Tamil population, including eleven monks, accounting to roughly 1% of all Sri Lankan Tamils in Sri Lanka.

== See also ==
- Early Buddhist schools
- Buddhism and science
- Sri Lankan Forest Tradition
- Sri Kalyani Yogasrama Samstha
- Nissarana Vanaya Meditation System
- Maha Bodhi Society
- Buddhist Publication Society
- Buddhist Cultural Centre
- Solosmasthana
- Atamasthana
- Godwin Samararatne
- Dewa (people)
