= Vidyodaya Pirivena =

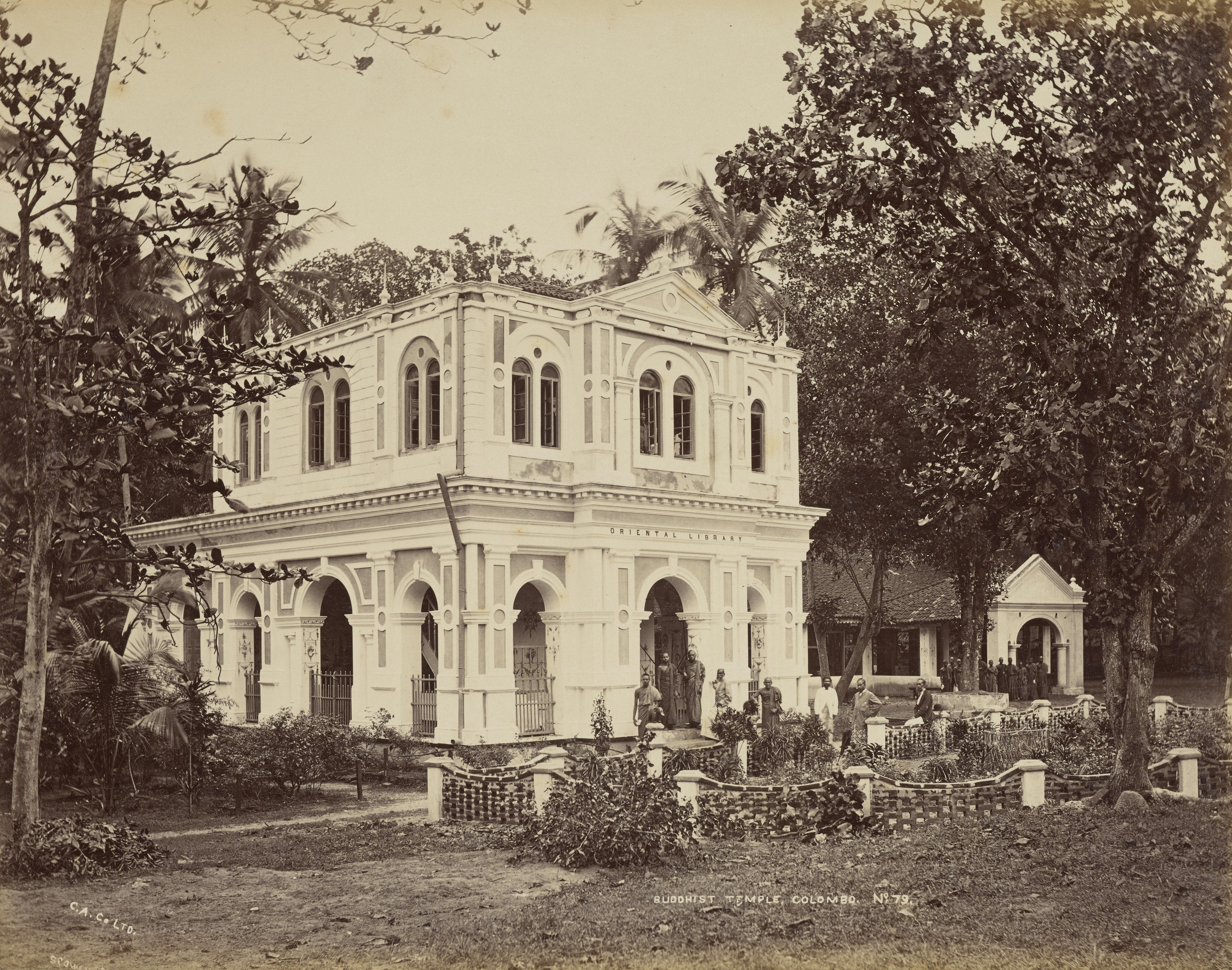
Hikkaduwe Sri Sumangala Thera at Vidyodaya pirivena in 1885

The Vidyodaya Pirivena was one of the prominent piriven (a monastic college, similar to a seminary, for the education of Buddhist monks) in Sri Lanka. It was founded in 1873 by Ven. Hikkaduwe Sri Sumangala Thera and later in 1959, the pirivena was granted the university status by the Government of Sri Lanka.

== Name ==
From 1958 to 1972, it became known as the Vidyodaya University and from 1972 to 1978 as the Vidyodaya Campus of the University of Sri Lanka during which time it became a secular state university. The renaming of the Vidyodaya Campus in 1978 as the University of Sri Jayewardenepura led to the re-emergence of the Maligakanda Pirivena, which has since claimed to be the successor to the Vidyodaya Pirivena.

== History ==
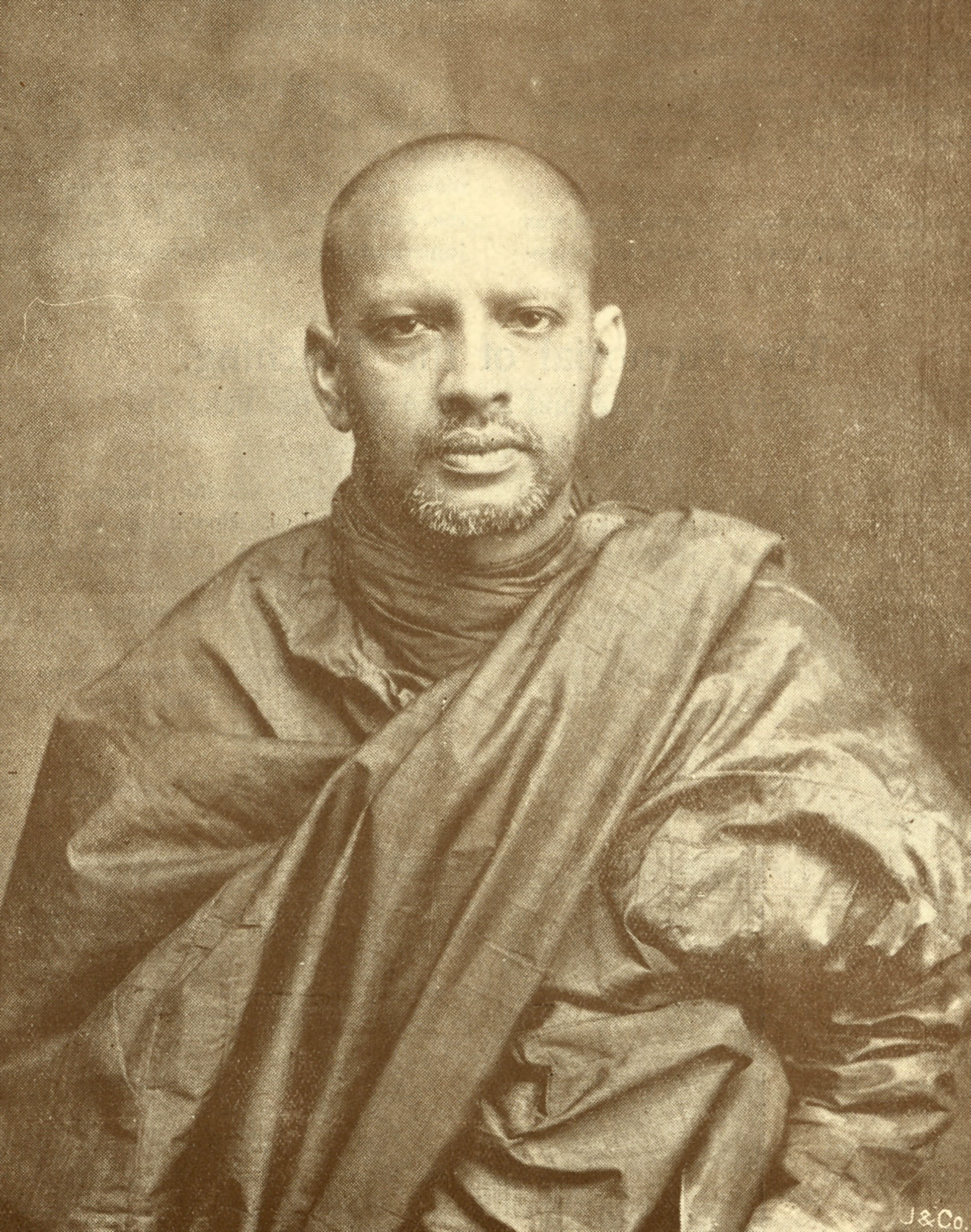
Siri Nanissara Thero, principal of Vidyodaya Pirivena before his death 1923.

The Vidyodya Pirivena was founded due to the efforts of Hikkaduwe Sri Sumangala Thera, who is considered to be one of the pioneers in the revival of Buddhism and the tradition of oriental education during the 19th century in Sri Lanka. The land at Maligakanda (a suburb of Colombo) and funds for its foundation were donated by the philanthropist Andiris Perera Dharmagunawardhana. Both Hikkaduwe Sri Sumangala Thera and Migettuwatte Gunananda Thera, following their success in the Panadura Debate, played a key roles in its development. Their aim was to train educated orator monks to save Buddhism from the decline it was undergoing due to colonial rule, and for that purpose it was made the study of logic compulsory in pirivena education. The Pirivena taught Buddhist studies as well as pseudo-sciences such as astrology, which were widely accepted and held in high esteem in traditional society.

Through a change to a new government in 1956 under Prime Minister S. W. R. D. Bandaranaike which had a policy of promoting national languages and culture, two new universities were established by conferring university status on the Vidyodaya Pirivena and Vidyalankara Pirivena. Under the Vidyodaya University and Vidyalankara University Act No 45 of 1958, the two universities were established as the Vidyodaya University at Maligakanda, and the Vidyalankara University at Kelaniya. Ven. Welivitiye Soratha Maha Thero, Principal of the Vidyodaya Pirivena, was appointed as the first Vice-Chancellor of the Vidyodaya University. The university was ceremonially opened on 16 February 1959.

However, the transition from Pirivena to University gradually converted it to a secular center of learning. The university was moved to Gangodawila, some 10 miles to the south east, in 1961 and in 1978 it was renamed as the University of Sri Jayewardenepura.
