= Ratmalane Sri Dharmaloka Thera =

Sri Lankan Buddhist monk and scholar

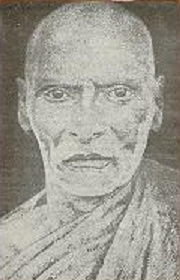
- Ratmalane Sri Dharmaloka Thera

Personal life
- Born: 28 May 1828 Ratmalana
- Died: 15 August 1885 (aged 57)
- Education: Parama Dhamma Chetiya Pirivena, Ratmalana

Religious life
- Religion: Buddhism
- School: Theravada
- Lineage: Siyam Nikaya
- Dharma name: Ven. Ratmalane Sri Dharmaloka Nayaka Thera

Senior posting
- Teacher: Walane Sri Siddhartha Maha Thera
- Students: Ratmalane Sri Dharmarama Thera

Ratmalane Sri Dharmaloka Thera (May 28, 1828 – August 15, 1885) was a scholar Buddhist monk who lived in the 19th century in Sri Lanka. An educationist and revivalist of Sri Lankan Buddhism, he was reputed for his knowledge of Pali, Sanskrit and Buddhist philosophy. Ratmalane Sri Dharmaloka Thera was the founder of Vidyalankara Pirivena, Peliyagoda, which was granted the University status later by the Sri Lankan government in 1959, and presently known as University of Kelaniya. Sri Dharmaloka College in Kelaniya, Sri Lanka is named after him.

== Life and work ==
He was born on 28 May 1828 at Ratmalana in Colombo district. His father was Mr. Don Coranelis Appuhami and mother was Mrs. Dona Hamine. Under the guidance of Ven. Thalangama Sobitha Thera and Ven. Andupe Sonuttara Thera. He was ordained in 1837 as a novice monk and was given the name "Ratmalane Dhramaloka". Ratmalane Sri Dharmaloka Thera received his higher education from Parama Dhamma Chetiya Pirivena in Ratmalana, under the guidance of Walane Sri Siddhartha Mahathera. Hikkaduwe Sri Sumangala Thera was one of his contemporaries at Parama Dhamma Chetiya Pirivena. In 1860 he obtained higher ordination of Upasampada from the Malwatta Chapter, Kandy. By which time he was accepted as a learned monk.

He taught the Dhamma (Buddhism) to the monks and lay students at his resident temple at Ratmalana and wrote and edited several classics. It was when he, along with his student monk Ven. Ratmalane Sri Dharmarama, came on the invitation to Dalugama to observe the 'vas' season (Rainy retreat) in 1875. During his stay, he took the initiative in setting up the Vidyalankara Dayaka Sabha. Subsequently the Vidyalankara Pirivena, Kelaniya was established on 1 November 1875.

Vidyalankara Pirivena, Kelaniya which was established by Ven. Ratmalane Dharmaloka Maha Thera was promoted to the state of University by the government in 1958. Vidyalankara Pirivena gave due place to language, religion, and literature at a time of their degradation. Intellectuals such as Ven. Ratmalane Sri Dharmarama Thera, Don Baron Jayatilaka, Mudaliar Palis Fernando Wimalagunawardena, Nicholas Attygalle are some of the earliest products of Vidyalankara Pirivena.

Leading a simple life according to the teachings of the Buddha was his motto which he promoted among his students. By training his chief disciple Ratmalane Sri Dharmarama Thera, to be well versed in the Dhamma (Buddhism), and to continue his Buddhist revivalist work, Ratmalane Sri Dharmaloka Thera had established a solid tradition to continue the good work he started. He died on August 15, 1885, at the age of 57.

== See also ==
- Buddhism in Sri Lanka
- Hikkaduwe Sri Sumangala Thera
- Weligama Sri Sumangala
- Sri Piyaratana Tissa Mahanayake Thera
