= Migettuwatte Gunananda Thera =

Sri Lankan Buddhist orator (1823–1890)

Ven. Migettuwatte Gunananda Thera පූජ්‍ය මිගෙට්ටුවත්තේ ගුණානන්ද හිමි
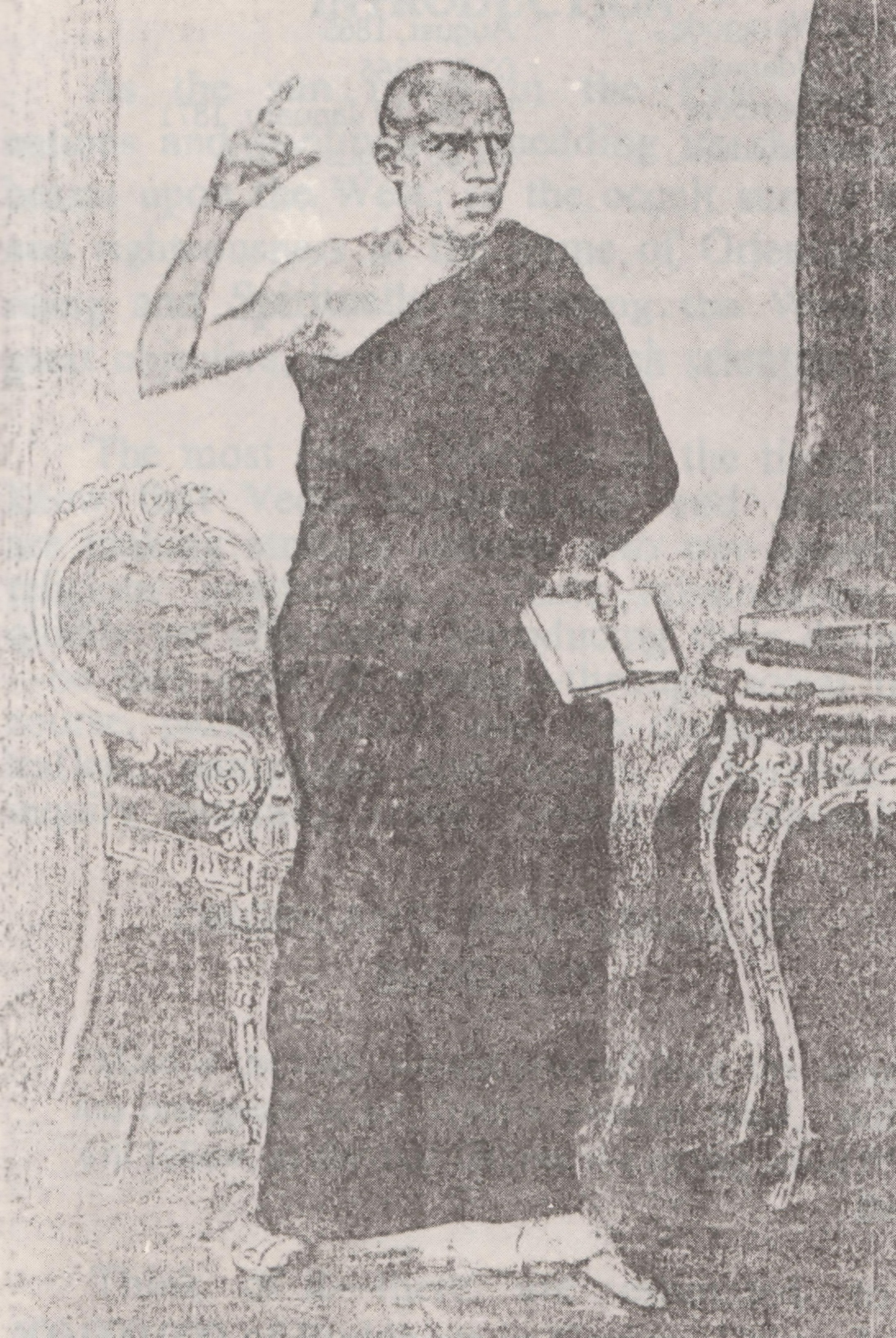
- Venerable Migettuwatte Gunananda Thera at Panadura (26 – 28 August 1873) vs Wesleyan Missionary Fathers
- Title: Vādibhasinha (Lion of Oratory)

Personal life
- Born: Mohottiwatta; 9 February 1823 Mohottiwatta (Migettuwatta), Balapitiya, British Ceylon
- Died: 21 September 1890 (aged 67) Colombo, British Ceylon

Religious life
- Religion: Theravada Buddhism
- School: Theravada
- Dharma name: Miggetuwaththe Gunanda himi

Senior posting
- Teacher: Thelikada Sonutthara Thera
- Based in: Deepaduttaaramaya, Kotahena, Colombo

Ven. Migettuwatte Gunananda Thera or Mohottiwatte Gunananda Thera (Sinhala: පූජ්‍ය මිගෙට්ටුවත්තේ ගුණානන්ද හිමි) (9 February 1823 – 21 September 1890) was a Sri Lankan Sinhala Buddhist orator. He is known for leading the Buddhist side in debates between Buddhists and Christians in Baddegama, Udanwita, Waragoda, Liyanagemulla, Gampola, and Panadura, where the most famous of the debates took place. As a result of the debates, Buddhism in Sri Lanka saw a revival.

== Early life ==
Gunananda Thera was born in 1823 to a rich Buddhist Sinhala Salagama caste family in a village called Migettuwatta or Mohottiwatta, near Balapitiya. His secular name was Wanigamuni Miguel Mendes Wimalarathna. Taught first by his parents, he exhibited oratorical skills from a young age. He had close contact with a Roman Catholic priest, who resided in a nearby church, and gained knowledge of the Bible and Christian doctrine. Originally intending to become a priest, he changed his mind after coming into contact with Buddhist monks from the nearby temples. He was ordained while in his twenties in the Dodanduwa Gala Uda Vihara by Venerable Thelikada Sonutthara Thera, the chief incumbent of the temple. His eloquent first sermon was given on the night that he was ordained; the people gathered in the temple exclaimed that the young Thera would cause Buddhism to prosper in the country and pledged their support for his religious work. Subsequently, he gained proficiency in Buddhism and oriental languages while he was in the temple.

While he was reading the magazine Bauddha Sahodaraya (Sinhalese: Buddhist Brotherhood), he learned that Buddhists in Colombo were subject to religious discrimination by Christians. Disturbed by the news, Gunananda Thera decided to move to Colombo and reside in Deepaduttaaramaya in Kotahena, the first Buddhist temple in Colombo, which was 300 years old. From there, Gunananda Thera began his speeches defending Buddhism against the arguments of the Christian missionaries.

== Debates ==
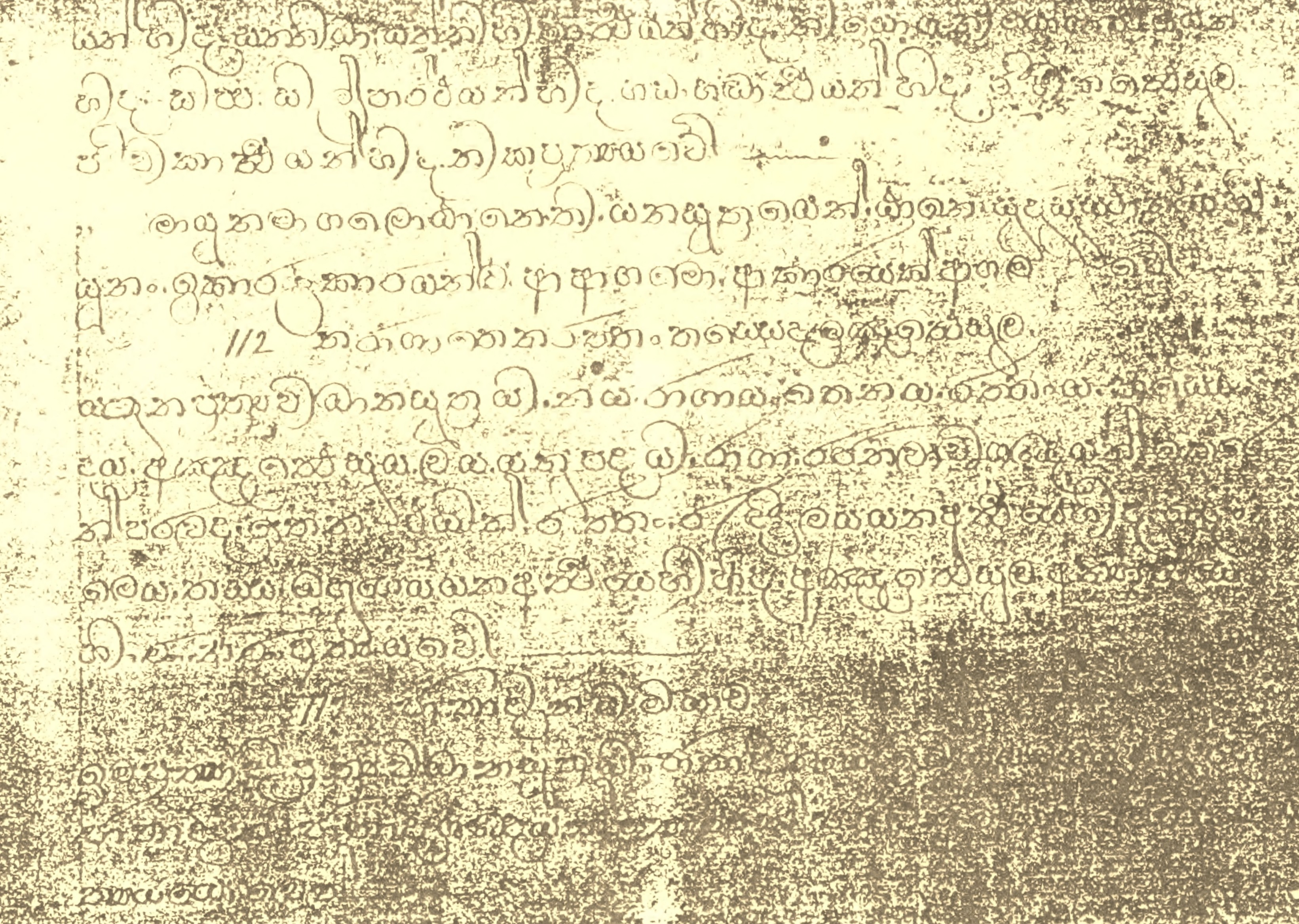
Ola scriptures and art of Gunananda Thera

Christian missionaries propagated their religion through pamphlets and books. Rev. D. J. Gogerly of the Wesleyan mission published Christian Pragnapthi (Doctrine of the Christians) in 1849. Gunananda Thera replied with Durlabdi Vinodini (Satire of Falsehood) in 1862 for Buddhists. Hikkaduwe Sri Sumangala Thera wrote Christiani Vada Mardanaya (Destruction of Christian Doctrine) and Samyak Darshanaya (Affirmation of Right View) in 1862–1863. Soon after, these publications were replaced by public debates.

The Baddegama debate originated from an argument arising between a young monk named Sumangala and a Christian priest in the temple of Baddegama. Gunananda Thera and many other monks, including Bulatgama Dhammalankara, Sri Sumanatissa, Kahawe Nanananda, Hikkaduwe Sumangala, Weligama Sri Sumangala, and Pothuwila Gunaratana, participated in the debate. The debate was not held face-to-face. This was because if the behaviour of the Christian debaters had led to conflicts, the Buddhists, as the majority, could be blamed. Thus, the two parties agreed to carry out the debate in writing. Originally, the text was composed in Baddegama, though later writings were carried out in Galle. The Waragoda debate was also held in 1865.

A third debate was conducted in Udanwita in Hathara Korele in present-day Kegalle District. The Creator, the Redeemer and the Eternal Heaven were the debate topics. The debate was carried out on 1 February 1866. John Edwards Hunupola (Hunupola Nilame) represented the Christian side; he was a former Buddhist monk and Christian convert. As agreed before the debate, Gunananda Thera published the summary of the debate. In response, Hunupola Nilame also published his own version of a summary. Gunananda Thera issued more publications to counter Hunupola Nilame's summary. There are no records of the Liyanagemulla debate, the only known fact is that it was held in 1866.

As the intensity of the debate rose between Buddhist and Christian sides, both parties agreed to debate in Gampola on 9 and 10 June 1871. Gunananda Thera displayed his oratory skills in this debate and in appreciation the crowd cried in joy. Afterward, they paraded Gunananda Thera around Gampola. After Gunananda Thera delivered several sermons at various places in Gampola, people arranged a procession, taking him to the Peradeniya railway station and sending him back to Colombo. In Colombo, people collected £75.00 to print the sermons he had delivered.

=== Panadura debate ===
All these debates culminated in the most notable, the Panadura debate (පානදුරාවාදය), which was held two years after the Gampola debate in 1873. The cause for the debate arose when Rev. David de Silva delivered a sermon on the soul at the Wesleyan Chapel, Panadura on 12 June 1873. Gunananda Thera delivered a sermon a week later criticising the points raised by de Silva. The two parties signed an agreement on 24 July 1873 to hold another debate at Panadura. However, this was not the only cause of the debate.

The Christians may have thought that the Buddhists were not educated and hence could be easily defeated in debate. However, the Buddhist monks were familiar with Pali and Sanskrit texts like Nyaya Bindu written by Dignāga and Tarka Sastra by Dharmakirti, which were written on the art of debating, and were not hesitant in accepting the challenge of debating in public.

The debate was held on 26 to 28 August 1873 on a property owned by Jeramias Dias near the Rankot Vihara. The ablest debaters were summoned on the side of the Christians. Gunananda Thera was the debater on the side of the Buddhists while de Silva and Catechist S. F. Sirimanna represented the Christian side. The debate revolved around topics ranging from the nature of God, the Soul, and resurrection, to the concept of Karma, Rebirth, Nirvana and the principle of Pratītyasamutpāda or dependent origination.

Dr K. D. G. Wimalaratna, Director of National Archives wrote:

"Rev. David de Silva, a fluent speaker in Pali and Sanskrit addressed the audience of around 6000–7000 – but only a very few understood him. In complete contrast was Mohottiwatte Gunananda Thera who used plain language to counter the arguments of his opponents."

Dr Vijaya Samaraweera in his article "The Government and Religion: Problems and Policies c. 1832 to c. 1910", stated:

"The Rev. Migettuwatte Gunananda proved himself to be a debater of a very higher order, mettlesome, witty and eloquent, if not especially erudite. The emotions generated by this debate and the impact of Migettuwatte Gunananda's personality had lasting effects on the next generation of Buddhist activities. Migettuwatte Gunananda's triumph at Panadura set the seal on a decade of quiet recovery of Buddhist confidence. In retrospect, the establishment of the 'Society for the Propagation of Buddhism' at Kotahena, and the Lankaprakara Press at Galle would seem to mark the first positive phase in this recovery."

At the end of the second day of the debate, the crowd chanted "sadhu, sadhu", displeasing the Christians. When the atmosphere became heated, Gunananda Thera raised his voice and ordered: "Everybody should be silent." After that remark, the crowd was dispersed without making any further commotion.

=== Impact of the debate ===
The impact of the debate was phenomenal, both locally and internationally. Locally, it was the principal factor behind reviving the identity and pride of Sinhala Buddhists. Internationally, it was instrumental in raising awareness of Buddhism in the west. The editor of Ceylon Times newspaper, John Cooper, arranged for Edward Perera to write a summary of the debate; thousands of copies of which were published. This translation was also published as a book, Buddhism and Christianity Face to Face by J.M. Peebles in the United States with an introduction in 1878. After reading a copy of the book, Henry Steel Olcott, the co-founder of the Theosophical Society, came to Sri Lanka on 17 May 1880. With the arrival of Colonel Olcott, the activities of the revival movement accelerated. Olcott described Gunananda Thera as: "The most brilliant Polemic Orator of the Island, the terror of the missionaries, with a very intellectual head, most brilliant and powerful champion of the Sinhalese Buddhism.

Rev. S. Langden, who was present when Gunananda Thera spoke in the Panadura debate, remarked:

There is that in his manner as he rises to speak which puts one in mind of some orators at home. He showed a consciousness of power with the people. His voice is of great compass and he has a clear ring above it. His action is good and the long yellow robe thrown over one shoulder helps to make it impressive. His power of persuasion, shows him to be a born orator.

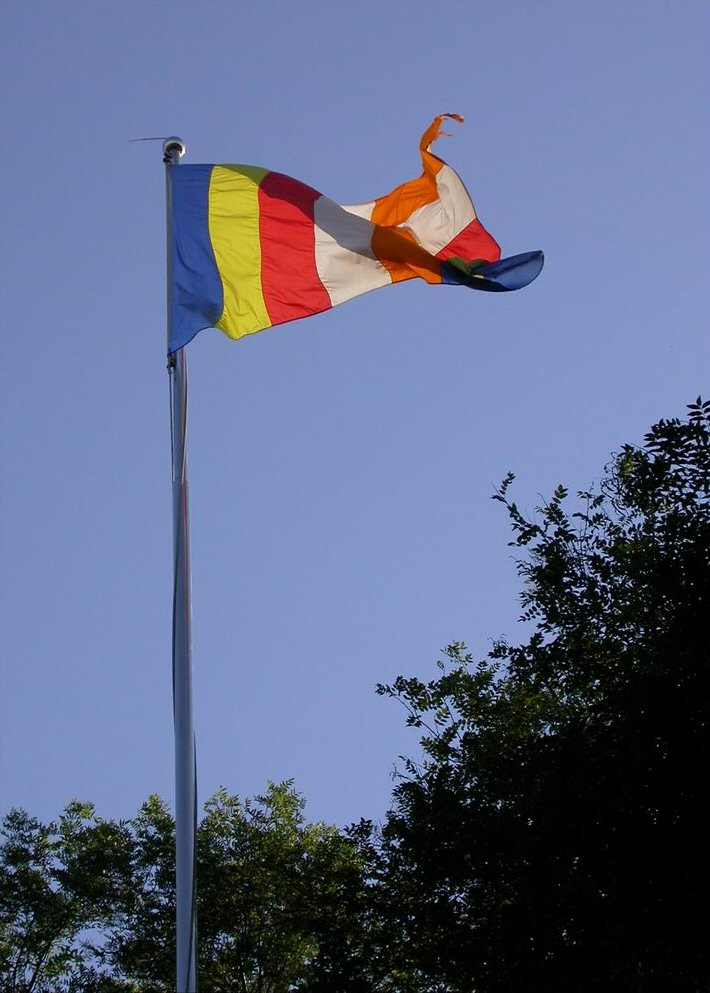
A Buddhist flag flying in Beijing

Gunananda Thera continued work to revive Buddhism in the country and published many Buddhist periodicals, including Riviresa, Lakmini Kirana and Sathya Margaya. He also served on the committee that designed the Buddhist flag in 1885.

Gunananda Thera died on 21 September 1890 at about 11:00 am at the age of 67.

== In popular culture ==
The biographical film Gunananda Himi Migettuwatte stars Roger Seneviratne as Gunananda Thera. Filming was concluded in April 2018.

== See also ==
- Hikkaduwe Sri Sumangala Thera
- Weligama Sri Sumangala
- Ratmalane Sri Dharmaloka Thera
- Sri Piyaratana Tissa Mahanayake Thera
