= Pirivena =

Sri Lankan monastic college

A pirivena (plural: piriven) is a monastic college that educates the monks in Sri Lanka. In ancient times, they were also centers of secondary and higher education for lay people. As of 2018, 753 piriven have been founded and maintained by the Ministry of Education. Young monks undergo training at these piriven before their ordination.

== History ==
=== Ancient ===
By 100 CE, a pirivena represented one of the highest levels of education in Sinhalese communities, and was the most common centralized educational institution on the island. Before this, an education was historically reserved for people attached to the religious establishment, and it would have then been the job of these people to traverse the villages and teach skills to the lay people, and therefore the vast majority of the island's people historically did not attend any formal educational institution. The Buddhist doctrine, however, prefers that lay people are also educated, and unlike the institutions in mainland India, the pirivena would have been attended by lay people as well.

The term is derived from the Pali word for 'living quarters', referring to how these institutions were aimed at teaching priests and monks on the island. It is mostly unique to Sri Lanka, but similar to universities found in mainland India.

The Mahavihara and Abhayagirivihara, commissioned through royal patronage from around 300 BCE, were among the first educational institutions to adopt this education system.

=== Colonialism ===
The first European colonialists arrived at the island's shores in 1505, and the Portuguese were the first to successfully conquer the island, being quite aggressive in spreading their faith. They converted King Dharmapala of Kotte, the apostate king, who eventually stopped state funding for these Buddhist educational institutions. The pirivena education system saw a rapid decline in Sri Lanka’s coastal areas, but the system continued to flourish in the Central Kandy Kingdom until the British conquest.

== Structure ==
The Mulika level offers five years of education and is the most basic. The students are taught six subjects: Pali, Sanskrit, Sinhala, English, Tipitaka studies and mathematics. This is followed by a final examination that can be used to advance to the next level.

The Maha level offers higher education, allowing students to enter a variety of subjects including philosophy, the history of religions, linguistics, Ayurveda, and astrology.

The Vidyayathana level offers the highest level of education, similar to the university level. Two major universities in Colombo, the University of Kelaniya and the University of Sri Jayewardenepura, are actually piriven vidyayathana renamed.

== Notable examples ==
- Vidyalankara Pirivena (later the Vidyalankara University)
- Vidyodaya Pirivena (later the Vidyodaya University)
- Parama Dhamma Chethiya Pirivena, a Pirivena in Dehiwala-Mount Lavinia, was established by Ven. Walane Sri Siddhartha Maha Thera in 1841.
- Sunethradevi Pirivena, a 600-years-old Pirivena in Pepiliyana, constructed by King Parakramabahu VI of the Kingdom of Kotte in honour of his mother, Queen Sunethradevi.

== See also ==
- Buddhist and Pali University of Sri Lanka
- International Theravada Buddhist Missionary University
- Mahachulalongkornrajavidyalaya University
- Mahamakut Buddhist University
- Sanam Luang Dhamma Studies
- State Pariyatti Sasana University, Yangon
- State Pariyatti Sasana University, Mandalay
- Tipitakadhara Tipitakakovida Selection Examinations
