= Hikkaduwe Sri Sumangala Thera =

Buddhist monk and one of the pioneers in Sri Lankan Buddhist revival movement

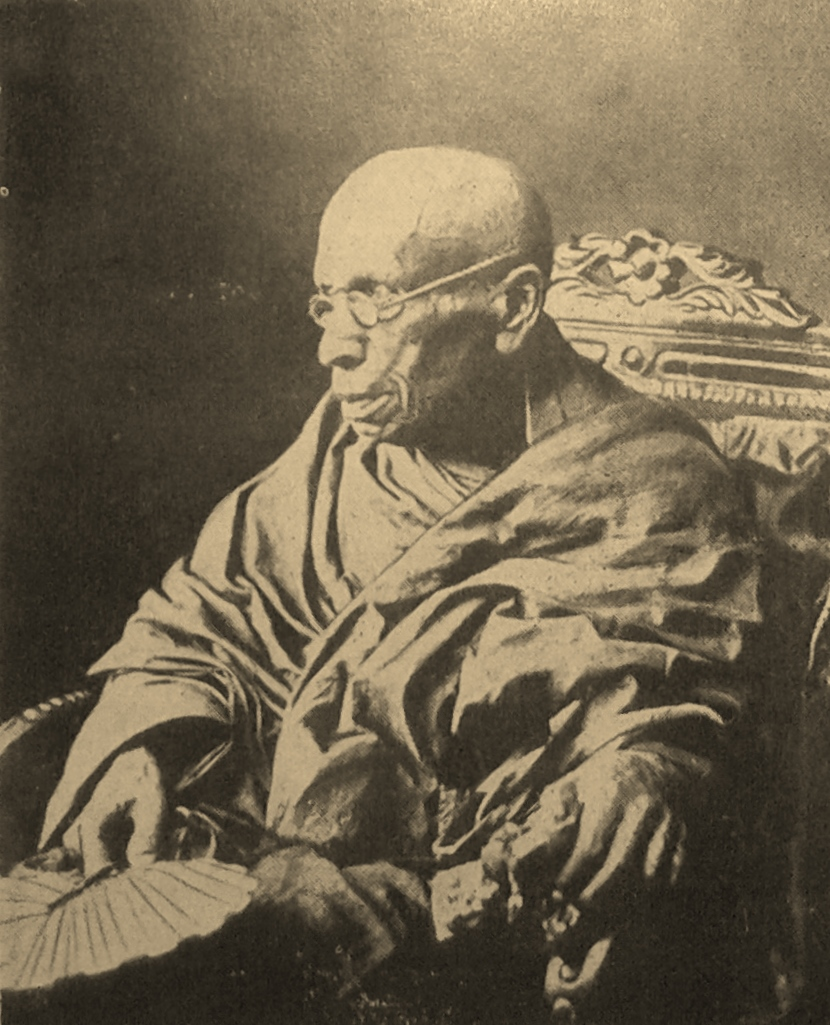
- Hikkaduwe Sri Sumangala Nayaka Thera
- Title: Thripitaka Vaagishwaracharya; Chief of Siyam Nikaya; Chief Monk of Sri Pada; Chief Monk of Colombo Nawa Korale; Chief Monk of Galle District

Personal life
- Born: Nicholas Gunawardhana; 20 January 1827 Hikkaduwa
- Died: 29 April 1911 (aged 84)
- Parent(s): Mr. Don Johannes Abeweera Gunawardhana (father); Mrs. Dandangoda Gamage Christina (mother)
- Education: Parama Dhamma Chetiya Pirivena, Ratmalana

Religious life
- Religion: Buddhism
- School: Theravada
- Lineage: Siyam Nikaya
- Dharma name: Most Ven.Hikkaduwe Sri Sumangala Nayaka Thera

Senior posting
- Teacher: Walane Sri Siddhartha Maha Thera
- Students: Anagarika Dharmapala

Hikkaduwe Sri Sumangala Thera (Sinhala: හික්කඩුවේ ශ්‍රි සුමංගල නාහිමි; 20 January 1827 – 29 April 1911) was a Sri Lankan Buddhist monk, who was one of the pioneers of Sri Lankan Buddhist revivalist movement in the 19th century. He was the founder of Vidyodaya Pirivena, Maligakanda in 1873, which was granted the university status later in 1959 by the Government of Sri Lanka. A veteran author and a fiery orator, he was a major figure in the Panadurawadaya, a religious debate held between Christian missionaries and Buddhist monks in 1873 at Panadura, Sri Lanka. He was well versed in Sinhala, Pali, Sanskrit, English, Buddhism, history, arithmetic, and archaeology and was one of the primary sources of information on Buddhism for the success of the Panadura debate.

== Biography ==
The birth name of Hikkaduwe Sri Sumangala Thera was Don Niculus Gunawardhana. He was born on 20 January 1827 to the family of Don Johannes Abeyweera Gunawardhana Maha Liyana Arachchi Ralahamy and his wife Dandangoda Gamage Christina Hamine of Hettigoda, Hikkaduwa in Galle District. He was the 5th in his family and was baptised according with the general practice prevailed at the time. Young Niculus received his primary education in Sinhala and Pali from the village temple, Hettigoda Thilakarama temple, Hikkaduwa under the tutelage of Ven. Hikkaduwe Sobitha Nayaka Thera and Ven. Mabotuwana Revata Nayaka Thera.

According to astrological predictions on young Niculus's horoscope, his parents decided to ordain him in the order of Buddhist monks as a 'samanera'. Thus at the age of 9, he was ordained under Arungamuwe Rewatha Thera of Thotagamuwa Raja Maha Vihara at Hikkaduwa and was given the Dharma name of "Hikkaduwe Sumangala". From his childhood, he was an eloquent speaker and a very good writer. After four years since becoming a monk, he received further education from monk Ven. Pannamgoda Jethuthara Thera and Ven. Bowala Dhammananda Thera. He acquired proficiency in English from John Coranelis Abayawardana, a renowned English scholar in the area. In 1844, the responsibility of Samanera Sumangala was transferred to Rev. Walane Sri Siddartha Thera. From then onward, he was positioned at the renowned Parama Dhamma Chethiya monastery in Rathmalana. He was not satisfied with just the knowledge he received from the monastery, he proceeded to learn Sanskrit, and subjects such as logic from a Brahmin named Kashinatha.

In 1848, he obtained higher ordination of Upasampada from the Malwatte Chapter, Kandy. Hikkaduwe Sri Sumangala Thera received his higher education from Parama Dhamma Chetiya Pirivena in Ratmalana, under the guidance of Walane Sri Siddhartha Mahathera. Ratmalane Sri Dharmaloka Thera was one of his contemporaries at Parama Dhamma Chetiya Pirivena. After gaining the higher ordination of Upasampada, he dedicated his life for the betterment of the world. He provided his services as a teacher at Parama Dhamma Chethiya Pirivena, Hikkaduwe Thilakaramaya, Bogahawatte Sudarshana Paramananda Viharaya, Kotahene Paramananda Viharaya. In 1872, in accordance to an invitation made by the Kotahena Paramananda Viharaya, he came to Colombo.

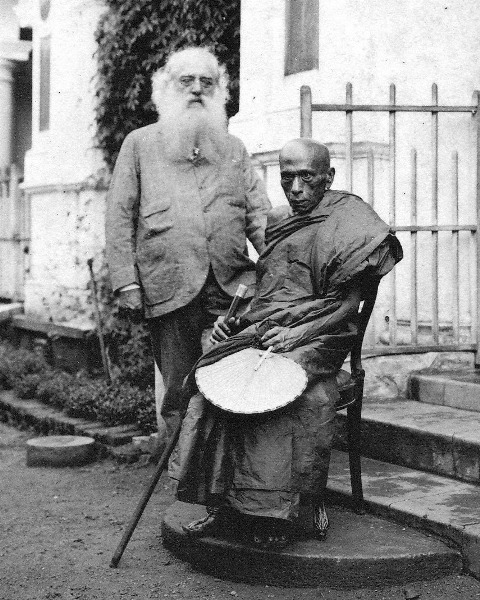
Most Ven. Hikkaduwe Sri Sumangala Thera and Colonel Henry Steel Olcott in Colombo, 1889

In 1864, he was appointed as the Chief priest of the Sripada (Adam's peak), the holy mountain of Sri Lanka. With this appointment he was unanimously recognised as the foremost Buddhist monk in the whole island. Hikkaduwe Sri Sumangala thera was well versed in Sinhala, Pali, Sanskrit and English languages and also had a very good knowledge in Buddhism, history, arithmetic and archaeology. He wrote many books in these subjects and was a leading figure of the Panadura debate (Panadurawadaya) held in 1873. It was after reading a report of this debate that Colonel Henry Steele Olcott visited Sri Lanka. Colonel Olcott learned Buddhism and Pali under Hikkaduwe Sri Sumangala Thera, who guided him to establish many Buddhist schools in Sri Lanka, such as Ananda College, Colombo (1886), Mahinda College, Galle (1892) and Dharmaraja College, Kandy (1887). It was also in the presence of Hikkaduwe Sri Sumangala Thera, C. W. Leadbeater, an influential member of the Theosophical Society repeated the Three Refuges and the Five Precepts of Buddhism and became a Buddhist.

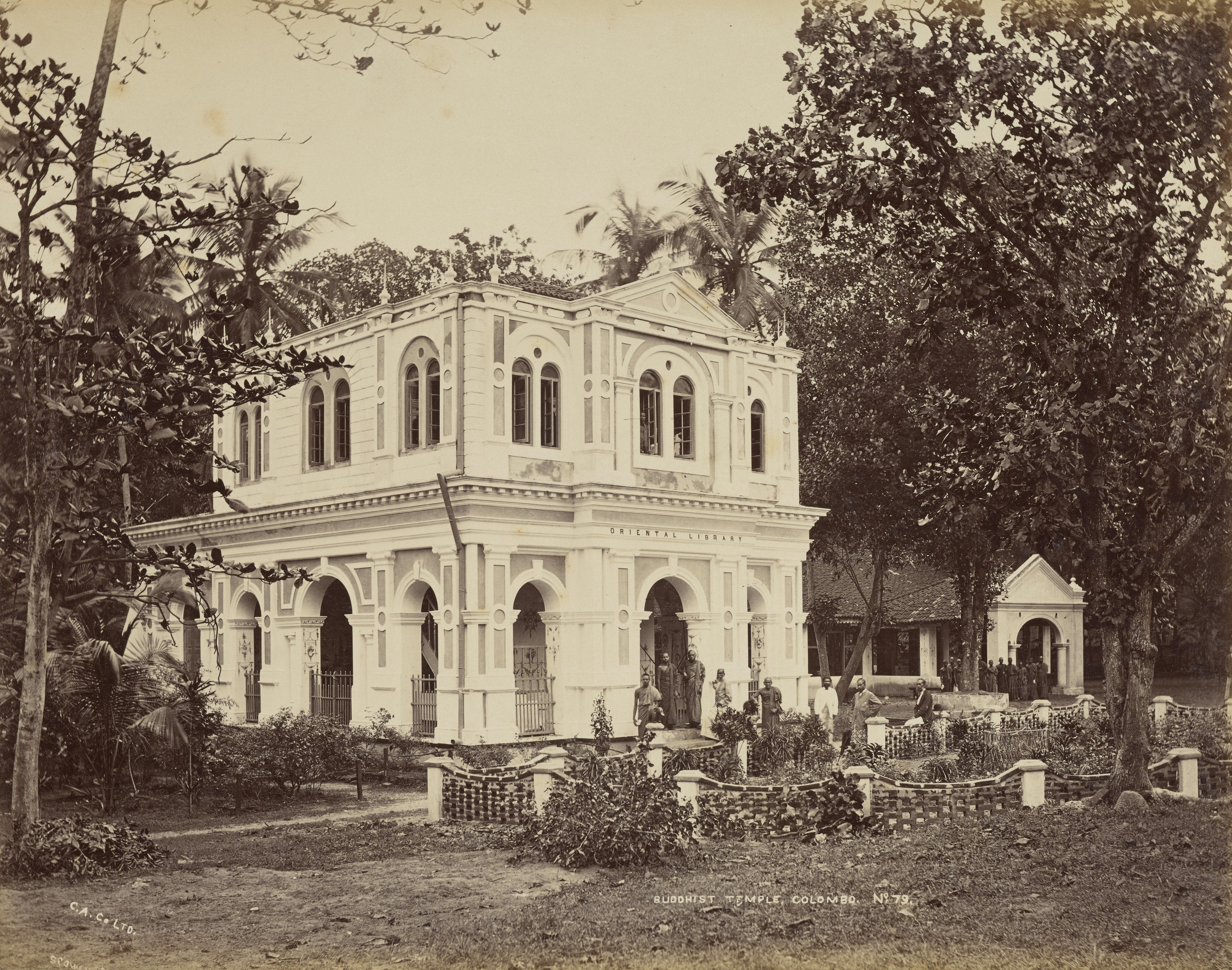
Hikkaduwe Sri Sumangala Thera at Vidyodaya pirivena in 1885

In 1885 with the donation of a land area in Hunupitiya Colombo by, H. L. De Mel, a non-Buddhist, he was able to establish the Gangarama Temple. He also took measures to bring down a part of the Sri maha bodhi from Anuradhapura and plant it amidst the Gangarama Temple premises for worship. He was the chief monk of the Gangarama Temple and upon his demise, he was succeeded by Rev. Devundara Sri Jinarathana Thera.

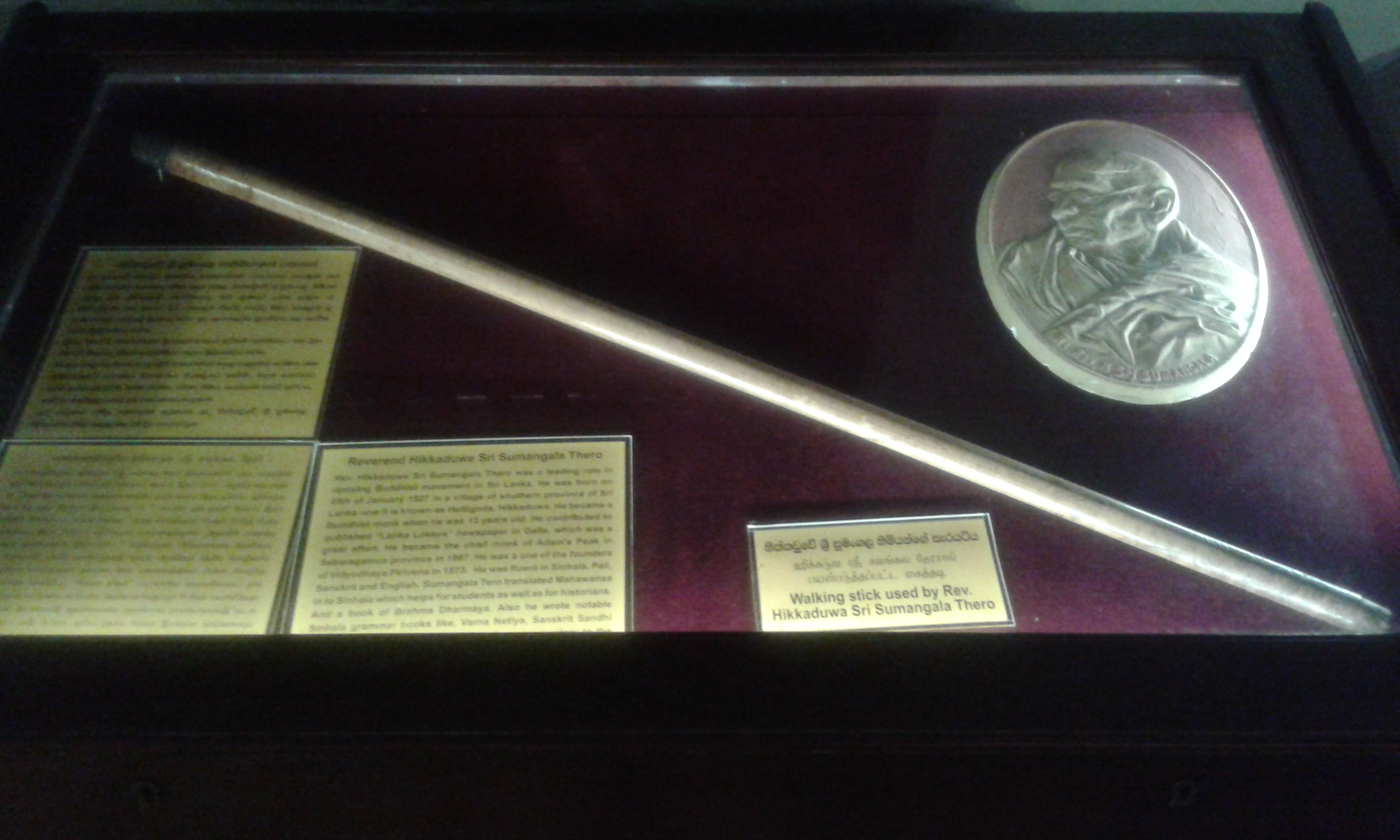
Most Ven. Thera's Walking Stick kept in Galle National Museum

Hikkaduwe Sri Sumangala Thera was the chairman of the 'Colombo Committee' which originally designed the Buddhist flag in 1885. Sri Sumangala thera was also a pioneer in Buddhist newspaper journalism in Sri Lanka. The paper "Lankaloka" was started by him, and afterwards, he assisted the local Buddhist community to publish papers such as "Sarasavisandaresa" and "Sinhala Bauddhaya". He was well honored and awarded many titles by Sri Lankans as well as the people of many other countries in the East and the West. Reputed and renowned institutions in Ireland, Italy, Hungary and Germany also bestowed felicitation degrees on him. After rendering a yeoman service to the Buddhasasana, Hikkaduwe Sri Sumangala Thera died on 29 April 1911, at the age of 84.

== Positions held ==
- Chief Monk of the Sri Pāda
- Chief Priest of Southern Sri Lanka
- Chief Priest of Colombo Nawa Koralaya
- Adviser of the Buddhist Theosophical Society
- Adviser of the Mahabodhi Society

== Literary works ==
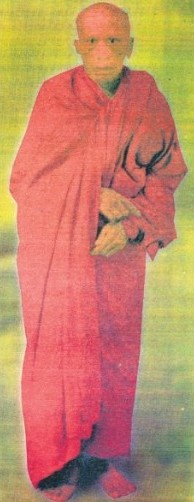
Thera in the early 1900s

- Brahma Dharmaya
- Warna Reethi (1873)
- Masarthu Lakshana (1858)
- Translation of Mahavamsa to Sinhalese (1847)
- Sidath Sangara Sannasa
- Kavya Shekhara Sannasa
- Balawatharatikawa
- Pali Namapada Malawa
- Kristhiyani Waada Wibhaathaniya
- Sathya Margaya
- Rivirasa
- Bhuddha Addahilla

== See also ==
- Buddhist flag
- Gangaramaya Temple
- Migettuwatte Gunananda Thera
- Ratmalane Sri Dharmaloka Thera
- Seema Malaka
- Sri Piyaratana Tissa Mahanayake Thera
- Weligama Sri Sumangala Thera
- Yagirala Pannananda
