= Vidyalankara Pirivena =

Prominent Buddhist college in Sri Lanka

Vidyalankara Pirivena is one of the largest Buddhist pirivenas in Sri Lanka. Located in Peliyagoda, it is nearly 150 years old. Under the pirivena's leadership, several schools were started in the region; one is Sri Dharmaloka College, one of the national schools in the region. Vidyalankara Pirivena was founded on November 1, 1875, by Venerable Ratmalane Sri Dharmaloka Thera.

In 1978, it became the University of Kelaniya.
