= Weligama Sri Sumangala =

Sri Lankan scholarly monk and leader of Amarapura monastic order

Ven. Weligama Sri Sumangala Thera

Personal life
- Born: 1825 Weligama (Sri Lanka)
- Died: March 13, 1905 (aged 80)
- Occupation: Religious leader

Religious life
- Religion: Buddhism
- School: Amarapura Nikaya (Theravada-Sri Lanka)

Weligama Sri Sumangala Thera (1825–1905) was an outstanding bhikkhu scholar with many important publications – Hitopadsesa Atthadassi, Hitopadsesa Padarthavykanaya, Upadesa Vinischaya, Siddanta Sekaraya. His work Siddhanta Sekharaya of 700 pages was printed at the Government Press in 1897. He established Saugathodaya Vidyalaya at Rankoth Viharaya in Panadura. He was a close associate of Sir Edwin Arnold the author of The Light of Asia. He is responsible for encouraging Arnold and Anagarika Dharmapala to advocate for the renovation of Buddhagaya and its return to Buddhist care.

== Biography ==
Weligama Sri Sumangala, a Buddhist High Priest of Ceylon, and a distinguished scholar whose place it will be hard to fill. He was in his eighty-second year and had led a life of remarkable usefulness. Born in Weligama, he came of one of the oldest and most respected families of the southern provinces. His father intended him to follow the medical profession but a serious illness compelled him to relinquish the plan, while the suffering he experienced at the time led him to abandon wealth and ease and give his life to the service of humanity. He entered the Buddhist priesthood when only twelve years of age, and received his education under the High Priest Bentota who was one of the most famous Sanskrit scholars of his day.

The Rev. Sumangala belonged to the Amarapura Nikaya of Buddhist priests, and in 1894 his colleagues in Ceylon unanimously elected him as their Chief High Priest, at the same time bestowing upon him a distinguished title. He lived and dressed as did the Buddhist monks at the time of Buddha more than twenty centuries ago, and was a noble representative of the religion of "The Enlightened One" in its original and purest form. His whole life has been characterised by a single-minded devotion to the uplifting of mankind, and he was beloved and appreciated by high and low, Buddhist and Christian. Reports of the impressive ceremonies at his cremation state variously.

== Schools named after ==
- Sri Sumangala College, Panadura
- Sri Sumangala Girls College, Panadura
- Sri Sumangala Boys College, Weligama
- Sri Sumangala Girls College, Weligama
