= Four Noble Truths =

Formulaic summary of Buddhist doctrines

Translations of Four Noble Truths
- Sanskrit: चत्वार्यार्यसत्यानि (catvāryāryasatyāni)
- Pali: cattāri āriyasaccāni
- Bengali: চতুরার্য সত্য (chôturarjô sôtyô)
- Burmese: သစ္စာလေးပါး (MLCTS: θɪʔsà lé bá)
- Chinese: 四聖諦 (T) / 四圣谛 (S) (Pinyin: sìshèngdì)
- Indonesian: Empat Kebenaran Mulia
- Japanese: 四諦 (Rōmaji: shitai)
- Khmer: អរិយសច្ចបួន (areyasachak buon)
- Korean: 사성제 (四聖諦) (RR: Saseongje)
- Mongolian: Хутагтын дөрвөн үнэн (Khutagtiin durvun unen) (ᠬᠤᠲᠤᠭᠲᠤ ᠢᠢᠨ ᠳᠥᠷᠪᠡᠨ ᠦᠨᠡᠨ)
- Sinhala: චතුරාර්ය සත්‍යය (Chaturarya Satya)
- Tagalog: Ang mga Apat na Maharlikang Katotohanan
- Tibetan: འཕགས་པའི་བདེན་པ་བཞི་ (Wylie: 'phags pa'i bden pa bzhi THL: pakpé denpa shyi)
- Thai: อริยสัจสี่ (RTGS: ariyasat si)
- Vietnamese: Tứ Thánh Đế (四聖諦)

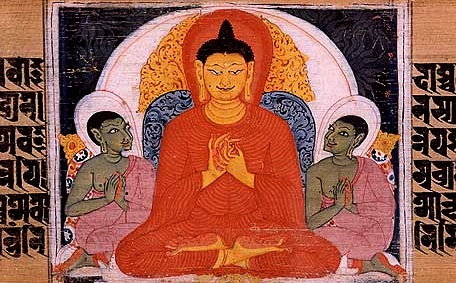
The Buddha teaching the Four Noble Truths. Sanskrit manuscript, c. 700–1100 CE. Nālandā, Bihar, India.

In Buddhism, the Four Noble Truths (Sanskrit: चत्वार्यार्यसत्यान, romanized: catvāryāryasatyāni; Pali: cattāri ariyasaccāni; "The Four arya satya") are "the truths of the noble one (the Buddha)," (Note: K.R. Norman, as quoted by Williams, Tribe & Wynne 2002, p. 41; see also Keown 2013, pp. 48–62.) (Note: [a] Four Noble Truths: BUDDHIST PHILOSOPHY, Encyclopaedia Britannica: "Although the term Four Noble Truths is well known in English, it is a misleading translation of the Pali term Chattari-ariya-saccani (Sanskrit: Chatvari-arya-satyani), because noble (Pali: ariya; Sanskrit: arya) refers not to the truths themselves but to those who recognize and understand them. A more accurate rendering, therefore, might be "four truths for the [spiritually] noble" [...]"; [b] Arhat (Buddhism), Encyclopædia Britannica) which state how things really are when they are seen correctly. (Note: Contemporary Buddhist teacher Mingyur Rinpoche describes the four arya satya as "Four Pure Insights into the Way Things Are". Contemporary scholar Peter Harvey translates arya satya as "True Realities for the Spiritually Ennobled".)

The four truths are:

- dukkha (lit. "suffering"; 'unsatisfactoriness', 'not being at ease'; (Note: Dukkha is often translated as "suffering," but this translation only covers the general meaning. The exact translation is dependent on the context.: Peter Harvey, Dukkha, Non-Self, and the Teaching of the Four Noble Truths, in Steven M. Emmanuel, A Companion to Buddhist Philosophy, p.30: ""suffering" is an appropriate translation only in a general, inexact sense [...] In the passage on the first True Reality, dukkha in "birth is dukkha" is an adjective [...] The best translation here is by the English adjective "painful," which can apply to a range of things."; Analayo (2003): "Dukkha is often translated as "suffering". Suffering, however, represents only one aspect of dukkha, a term whose range of implications is difficult to capture with a single English word. Dukkha can be derived from the Sanskrit kha, one meaning of which is "the axle-hole of a wheel", and the antithetic prefix duå (= dus), which stands for "difficulty" or "badness". The complete term then evokes the image of an axle not fitting properly into its hole. According to this image, dukkha suggests "disharmony" or "friction". Alternatively dukkha can be related to the Sanskrit stha, "standing" or "abiding", combined with the same antithetic prefix duå. Dukkha in the sense of "standing badly" then conveys nuances of "uneasiness" or of being "uncomfortable". In order to catch the various nuances of "dukkha", the most convenient translation is "unsatisfactoriness", though it might be best to leave the term untranslated."; Dalai Lama, Thubten Chodron, Approaching the Buddhist Path, p.279 note 2: "Duhkha (P. dukkha) is often translated as "suffering," but this translation is misleading. Its meaning is more nuanced and refers to all unsatisfactory states and experiences, many of which are not explicitly painful. While the Buddha says that life under the influence of afflictions and polluted karma is unsatisfactory, he does not say that life is suffering."; Gombrich, What the Buddha Thought, p.10: "there has been a lot of argument over how to translate the word dukkha; and again, the choice of translation must depend heavily on the context. But what is being expressed is that life as we normally experience it is unsatisfactory."; According to Khantipalo (2003, p. 46), "suffering" is an incorrect translation, since dukkha refers to the ultimately unsatisfactory nature of temporary states and things, including pleasant but temporary experiences.; According to Emmanuel (2015, p. 30), Dukkha is the opposite of sukha, "pleasure", and it is better translated as "pain".; Huxter (2016, p. 10): "dukkha (unsatisfactoriness or suffering)..."; Anderson (2013, pp. 1, 22 with note 4): "(...) the three characteristics of samsara/sankhara (the realm of rebirth): anicca (impermance), dukkha (pain) and anatta (no-self).") from dush-stha, 'standing unstable'; also translated as "unreliable", "precarity, instability, an unreliable place to stand", "the Uncontrolled"). Dukkha (precariousness) is an innate characteristic of transient existence; (Note: Four Noble Truths: BUDDHIST PHILOSOPHY, Encyclopaedia Britannica, Quote: "The first truth, suffering (Pali: dukkha; Sanskrit: duhkha), is characteristic of existence in the realm of rebirth, called samsara (lit. 'wandering').") (Note: Anderson (2004, pp. 295–297): "This, bhikkhus, is the noble truth that is suffering. Birth is suffering; old age is suffering; illness is suffering; death is suffering; sorrow and grief, physical and mental suffering, and disturbance are suffering. [...] In short, all life is suffering, according to the Buddha's first sermon.")
- samudaya (origin, arising, combination; 'cause'): in conjunction with this unsteadiness there is thirst (desire, longing, craving) for, attachment to, and repulsion towards transient, unsatisfactory things and feelings; (Note: Four Noble Truths: BUDDHIST PHILOSOPHY, Encyclopaedia Britannica, Quote: "The second truth is the origin (Pali and Sanskrit: samudaya) or cause of suffering, which the Buddha associated with craving or attachment in his first sermon.") (Note: Anderson 2004, pp. 295–297: "The second truth is samudaya (arising or origin). To end suffering, the four noble truths tell us, one needs to know how and why suffering arises. The second noble truth explains that suffering arises because of craving, desire, and attachment.") (Note: When taking dukkha literal as suffering, taṇhā is often interpreted in western languages as the "cause" of "suffering," but tanha can also be interpreted as the factor tying us to physical and emotional suffering, or as a response to physical and emotional suffering, trying to escape it;)
- nirodha (cessation, ending, confinement): this whole mass of attachment to non-controllable things can be 'blown out' (nirvana) or contained by the confinement or letting go of this craving and revulsion; (Note: Anderson 2004, pp. 295–297: "The third truth follows from the second: If the cause of suffering is desire and attachment to various things, then the way to end suffering is to eliminate craving, desire, and attachment. The third truth is called nirodha, which means 'ending' or 'cessation'. To stop suffering, one must stop desiring.")
- marga (road, path, way): the Noble Eightfold Path is the path leading to the confinement of this desire, attachment, and revulsion, and the release from dukkha. (Note: Anderson 2004, pp. 295–297: "This, bhikkhus, is the noble truth that is the way leading to the ending of suffering. This is the eightfold path of the noble ones: right view, right intention, right speech, right action, right livelihood, right effort, right mindfulness, and right concentration.[..] The Buddha taught the fourth truth, maarga (Pali, magga), the path that has eight parts, as the means to end suffering.")

The four truths are stated in various ways in the ancient Buddhist texts and are traditionally identified as the first teaching given by the Buddha. (Note: Graham Harvey: "Siddhartha Gautama found an end to rebirth in this world of suffering. His teachings, known as the dharma in Buddhism, can be summarized in the Four Noble truths." Geoffrey Samuel (2008): "The Four Noble Truths [...] describe the knowledge needed to set out on the path to liberation from rebirth." See also: (Note: Thanissaro Bhikkhu, The Truth of Rebirth And Why it Matters for Buddhist Practice) The Theravada tradition holds that insight into these four truths is liberating in itself. This is reflected in the Pali canon. According to Donald Lopez, "The Buddha stated in his first sermon that when he gained absolute and intuitive knowledge of the four truths, he achieved complete enlightenment and freedom from future rebirth." The Maha-parinibbana Sutta also refers to this liberation. Carol Anderson: "The second passage where the four truths appear in the Vinaya-pitaka is also found in the Mahaparinibbana-sutta (D II 90–91). Here, the Buddha explains that it is by not understanding the four truths that rebirth continues." Mahaparinibbana-sutta: Through not seeing the Four Noble Truths, Long was the weary path from birth to birth. When these are known, removed is rebirth's cause, The root of sorrow plucked; then ends rebirth. On the meaning of moksha as liberation from rebirth, see Patrick Olivelle in the Encyclopædia Britannica. (Note: Patrick Olivelle (2012), Encyclopædia Britannica, Moksha (Indian religions))) They are often regarded as the most important teaching in Buddhism where they have both a symbolic and a propositional function. As symbols, they represent the awakening and liberation of the Buddha and the potential for his followers to reach the same liberation and freedom that he did. As propositions, the Four Truths are a conceptual framework that appear in the Pali canon and early Hybrid Sanskrit Buddhist scriptures as a part of the broader "network of teachings" (the "dhamma matrix") which have to be taken together. They provide a conceptual framework for introducing and explaining Buddhist thought, which has to be personally understood or "experienced". (Note: Gethin: "The word satya (Pali sacca) can certainly mean truth, but it might equally be rendered as 'real' or 'actual thing'. That is, we are not dealing here with propositional truths with which we must either agree or disagree, but with four 'true things' or 'realities' whose nature, we are told, the Buddha finally understood on the night of his awakening. [...] This is not to say that the Buddha's discourses do not contain theoretical statements of the nature of suffering, its cause, its cessation, and the path to its cessation, but these descriptions function not so much as dogmas of the Buddhist faith as a convenient conceptual framework for making sense of Buddhist thought.")

As propositions, the Four Truths resist precise definition but refer to and express the basic orientation of Buddhism: unguarded sensory contact gives rise to craving and clinging to impermanent states and things, which are dukkha, "unsatisfactory," "incapable of satisfying," and painful. This craving keeps us caught in saṃsāra, (Note: See: * Gogerly (1861): "1. That sorrow is connected with existence in all its forms. 2. That its continuance results from a continued desire of existence." *Perry Schmidt-Leukel: "Thirst can be temporarily quenched but never brought to final stillness. It is in this sense that thirst is the cause of suffering, duhkha. And because of this thirst, the sentient beings remain bound to samsara, the cycle of constant rebirth and redeath: it is this craving which leads to renewed existence as the Second Noble Truth." * See also Williams & Wynne, Spiro.) "wandering", usually interpreted as the endless cycle of repeated rebirth, (Note: Buddhist modernism and some Theravadins have reinterpreted these teachings as "birth of ego". See, for example Payutto, and Buddhist modernism#West: Naturalized Buddhism.) and the continued dukkha that comes with it, (Note: On samsara, rebirth and redeath: * Mahasatipatthana-sutta: "And what, bhkkhus, is the noble truth that is the arising of pain? This is craving that leads to rebirth." * accesstoisight.org: "Because of our ignorance (avijja) of these Noble Truths, because of our inexperience in framing the world in their terms, we remain bound to samsara, the wearisome cycle of birth, aging, illness, death, and rebirth." (Note: accestoinsight.org, What is Theravada Buddhism?) * Paul Williams: "All rebirth is due to karma and is impermanent. Short of attaining enlightenment, in each rebirth one is born and dies, to be reborn elsewhere in accordance with the completely impersonal causal nature of one's own karma. The endless cycle of birth, rebirth, and redeath, is samsara." * Buswell and Lopez on "rebirth": "An English term that does not have an exact correlate in Buddhist languages, rendered instead by a range of technical terms, such as the Sanskrit PUNARJANMAN (lit. "birth again") and PUNABHAVAN (lit. "re-becoming"), and, less commonly, the related PUNARMRTYU (lit. 'redeath')." The term Agatigati or Agati gati (plus a few other terms) is generally translated as 'rebirth, redeath'; see any Pali-English dictionary; e.g. p. 94-95 of Rhys Davids & William Stede, where they list five Sutta examples with rebirth and re-death sense. See also punarmrityu) but also referring to the endless cycle of attraction and rejection that perpetuates the ego-mind. There is a way to end this cycle, (Note: Warder refers to Majjhima Nikaya 75: "I gave up the desire for pleasure [...] I did not long for them [...] Now what was the cause? That delight, Māgandiya, which is apart from pleasures, apart, from bad principles, which even stands completely surpassing divine happiness, enjoying that delight I did not long for inferior ones, did not take pleasure in them.") namely by attaining nirvana, cessation of craving, whereafter rebirth and the accompanying dukkha will no longer arise again. (Note: Ending rebirth: * Graham Harvey: "The Third Noble Truth is nirvana. The Buddha tells us that an end to suffering is possible, and it is nirvana. Nirvana is a "blowing out", just as a candle flame is extinguished in the wind, from our lives in samsara. It connotes an end to rebirth" * Spiro: "The Buddhist message then, as I have said, is not simply a psychological message, i.e. that desire is the cause of suffering because unsatisfied desire produces frustration. It does contain such a message to be sure; but more importantly it is an eschatological message. Desire is the cause of suffering because desire is the cause of rebirth; and the extinction of desire leads to deliverance from suffering because it signals release from the Wheel of Rebirth." * John J. Makransky: "The third noble truth, cessation (nirodha) or nirvana, represented the ultimate aim of Buddhist practice in the Abhidharma traditions: the state free from the conditions that created samsara. Nirvana was the ultimate and final state attained when the supramundane yogic path had been completed. It represented salvation from samsara precisely because it was understood to comprise a state of complete freedom from the chain of samsaric causes and conditions, i.e., precisely because it was unconditioned (asamskrta)." * Walpola Rahula: "Let us consider a few definitions and descriptions of Nirvana as found in the original Pali texts [...] 'It is the complete cessation of that very thirst (tanha), giving it up, renouncing it, emancipation from it, detachment from it.' [...] 'The abandoning and destruction of craving for these Five Aggregates of Attachment: that is the cessation of dukkha. [...] 'The Cessation of Continuity and becoming (Bhavanirodha) is Nibbana.'") This can be accomplished by following the eightfold path, confining our automatic responses to sensory contact by restraining oneself, cultivating discipline and wholesome states, and practicing mindfulness and dhyana (meditation).

Since the 19th century, scholars have argued that the formulation of the four truths were a later development in Buddhism, though this proposal hasn't been settled yet. (Note: According to Bhikkhu Anālayo, scholar and Buddhist monk, the four truths do appear in early discourse and Vinaya parallels, indicating that they were part of the developing tradition early on.) According to Carol S. Anderson, (Note: Professor of religion, Kalamazoo College; Co-Editor of the Journal of Buddhist–Christian Studies.) the function of the four truths, and their importance, developed over time and the Buddhist tradition slowly recognized them as the Buddha's first teaching. According to orientalist Johannes Bronkhorst and Anderson this tradition was established when prajñā, or "liberating insight", came to be regarded as liberating in itself, instead of or in addition to the practice of dhyana. This "liberating insight" gained a prominent place in the sutras, and the four truths came to represent this liberating insight, as a part of the enlightenment story of the Buddha.

Anderson proposes that the four truths grew to be of central importance in the Theravāda tradition of Buddhism by about the 5th-century CE, with the composition of the commentaries, with the Theravāda tradition claiming that the insight into the four truths is liberating in itself. The four truths are less prominent in the Mahāyāna tradition, which sees the higher aims of insight into śūnyatā, emptiness, and following the Bodhisattva path as central elements in their teachings and practice. The Mahāyāna tradition reinterpreted the four truths to explain how a liberated being can still be "pervasively operative in this world". Beginning with the exploration of Buddhism by western colonialists in the 19th century and the development of Buddhist modernism, they came to be often presented in the west as the central teaching of Buddhism, sometimes with novel modernistic reinterpretations very different from the historic Buddhist traditions in Asia.

== The Four Truths ==
=== Basic set ===
According to philologist K.R. Norman, the basic set is as follows:

- idaṃ dukkhaṃ, "this is pain"
- ayaṃ dukkha-samudayo, "this is the origin of pain"
- ayaṃ dukkha-nirodho, "this is the cessation of pain"
- ayaṃ dukkha-nirodha-gāminī paṭipadā, "this is the path leading to the cessation of pain." The key terms in the longer version of this expression, dukkha-nirodha-gāminī paṭipadā, can be translated as follows:

- Gāminī: leading to, making for (Note: "Pali Text Society Dictionary".)
- Paṭipadā: road, path, way; the means of reaching a goal or destination

=== Mnemonic set ===
According to Norman, the Pali canon contains various shortened forms of the four truths, the "mnemonic set", which were "intended to remind the hearer of the full form of the NTs." The earliest form of the mnemonic set was "dukkham samudayo nirodho marga", without the reference to the Pali terms sacca or arya, which were later added to the formula. The four mnemonic terms can be translated as follows:

1. Dukkha – literally "suffering", in context "unreliable", "precarity, instability, an unreliable place to stand". From dush-stha, "standing unstable," Dukkha is most commonly translated as "suffering". According to Khantipalo, this is an incorrect translation, since dukkha refers to the ultimately unsatisfactory nature of temporary states and things, including pleasant but temporary experiences. Alternate renderings are "incapable of satisfying", "the unsatisfactory nature and the general insecurity of all conditioned phenomena"; "painful." According to Emmanuel, Dukkha is the opposite of sukha, (non-transient) "pleasure", and it is better translated as "pain". According to Jonathan C. Gold, "duḥkha just means precarity, instability, an unreliable place to stand", referring to "bumpiness, instability, and uncertainty—not a good ride, not a safe place to stand, being unreliable", outside of ones control.
2. Samudaya – "origin", "source", "arising", "coming to existence"; "aggregate of the constituent elements or factors of any being or existence", "cluster", "coming together", "combination", "producing cause", "rising". (Note: Sanskrit Dictionary for spoken Sanskrit, samudaya) Conjunct of:
  1. sam – "with, together with";
  2. udaya – "rising," "swelling up"; "rising up, coming forth"; "elevation, exaltation, rise; growth"; "result, consequence";
3. Nirodha – cessation; release; to confine; "prevention, suppression, enclosing, restraint" (Note: spokensanskrit.de, nirodha)
4. Marga – "path".

=== Full set – Dhammacakkappavattana Sutta ===
The four truths are best known from their presentation in the Dhammacakkappavattana Sutta, (Note: For example: Dhamma (1997, p. 55): The Four Noble Truths [...] are: 1. The Noble Truth of Suffering (dukkha); 2. The Noble Truth of the origin of suffering (samudaya); 3. The Noble Truth of the cessation of suffering (nirodha); 4. The Noble Truth of the path leading to the cessation of suffering (marga).; Bhikkhu Bodhi: "The Four Noble Truths are as follows: 1. The truth of Dukkha; 2. The truth of the origin of Dukkha; 3. The truth of the cessation of Dukkha; 4. The truth of the path, the way to liberation from Dukkha".; Geshe Tashi Tsering (2005, loc. 246–250): "The four noble truths are: 1. The noble truth of suffering; 2. The noble truth of the origin of suffering; 3. The noble truth of the cessation of suffering and the origin of suffering; 4. The noble truth of the path that leads to the cessation of suffering and the origin of suffering."; Goldstein (2002, p. 24): "The four noble truths are the truth of suffering, its cause, its end, and the path to that end.) which contains two sets of the four truths, while various other sets can be found in the Pāli Canon of the Theravadan Buddhist tradition. The full set, which is most commonly used in modern expositions, contains grammatical errors, pointing to multiple sources for this set and translation problems within the ancient Buddhist community. Nevertheless, they were considered correct by the Pali tradition, which did not correct them.

According to the Buddhist tradition, the Dhammacakkappavattana Sutta, "Setting the Wheel of Dhamma in Motion", contains the first teachings that the Buddha gave after attaining full awakening, and liberation from rebirth. According to Buddhist scholar L. S. Cousins, many scholars are of the view that "this discourse was identified as the first sermon of the Buddha only at a later date," and according to Carol S. Anderson (Note: Professor of religion, Kalamazoo College; Co-Editor of the Journal of Buddhist–Christian Studies.) the four truths may originally not have been part of this sutta, but were later added in some versions. Within this discourse, the four noble truths are given as follows ("bhikkhus" is normally translated as "Buddhist monks"):

Now this, bhikkhus, is the noble truth of suffering ['the unreliable', 'the Uncontrollable', precarity]: birth is suffering ['unreliable', 'uncontrollable', precarious], aging is suffering ['unreliable', 'uncontrollable', precarious], illness is suffering ['unreliable', 'uncontrollable', precarious], death is suffering ['unreliable', 'uncontrollable', precarious]; union with what is displeasing is suffering ['unreliable', 'uncontrollable', precarious]; separation from what is pleasing is suffering ['unreliable', 'uncontrollable', precarious]; not to get what one wants is suffering ['unreliable', 'uncontrollable', precarious]; in brief, the five aggregates subject to clinging are suffering ['unreliable', 'uncontrollable', precarious].

Now this, bhikkhus, is the noble truth of the origin of [attachment to] suffering ['the unreliable', 'the Uncontrollable', precarity]: it is this craving [taṇhā, "thirst"] which leads to re-becoming, accompanied by delight and lust, seeking delight here and there; that is, craving for sensual pleasures, craving for becoming, craving for disbecoming.

Now this, bhikkhus, is the noble truth of the cessation of [attachment to] suffering ['the unreliable', 'the Uncontrollable', precarity]: it is the remainderless fading away and cessation of that same craving, the giving up and relinquishing of it, freedom from it, non-reliance on it.

Now this, bhikkhus, is the noble truth of the way leading to the cessation of [attachment to] suffering ['the unreliable', 'the Uncontrollable', precarity]: it is this noble eightfold path; that is, right view, right intention, right speech, right action, right livelihood, right effort, right mindfulness, right concentration.

According to this sutra, with the complete comprehension of these four truths release from samsara, the cycle of rebirth, was attained:

Knowledge & vision arose in me: 'Unprovoked is my release. This is the last birth. There is now no further becoming.

The comprehension of these four truths by his audience leads to the opening of the Dhamma Eye, that is, the attainment of right vision:

Whatever is subject to origination is subject to cessation.

=== Alternative formulations ===
According to L.S. Cousins, the four truths are not restricted to the well-known form where dukkha is the subject. Other forms take "the world, the arising of the world" or "the āsavas, the arising of the āsavas" as their subject. According to Cousins, "the well-known form is simply shorthand for all of the forms." "The world" refers to the saṅkhāras, that is, all compounded things, or to the six sense spheres.

The various terms all point to the same basic idea of Buddhism, as described in five skandhas and twelve nidānas. In the five skandhas, sense-contact with objects leads to sensation and perception; the saṅkhāra ('inclinations', c.q. craving etc.) determine the interpretation of, and the response to, these sensations and perceptions, and affect consciousness in specific ways. The twelve nidānas describe the further process: craving and clinging (upādāna) lead to bhava (becoming) and jāti (birth).

In the orthodox interpretation, bhava is interpreted as kammabhava, that is, karma, while jāti is interpreted as rebirth: from sensation comes craving, from craving comes karma, from karma comes rebirth. The aim of the Buddhist path is to reverse this causal chain: when there is no (response to) sensation, there is no craving, no karma, no rebirth. In Thai Buddhism, bhava is interpreted as behavior which serves craving and clinging, while jāti is interpreted as the repeated birth of the ego or self-sense, which perpetuates the process of self-serving responses and actions.

=== Truths for the noble ones ===
The Pali terms ariya sacca (Sanskrit: arya satya) are commonly translated as "noble truths". This translation is a convention started by the earliest translators of Buddhist texts into English. According to K.R. Norman, this is just one of several possible translations. According to Buddhist scholar Paul Williams,

[T]here is no particular reason why the Pali expression ariyasaccani should be translated as 'noble truths'. It could equally be translated as 'the nobles' truths', or 'the truths for nobles', or 'the nobilising truths', or 'the truths of, possessed by, the noble ones' [...] In fact the Pali expression (and its Sanskrit equivalent) can mean all of these, although the Pali commentators place 'the noble truths' as the least important in their understanding.

The term "arya" was later added to the four truths. The term ariya (Sanskrit: arya) can be translated as "noble", "not ordinary", "valuable", "precious". (Note: Ajahn Sucitto states: "So the four truths (ariya sacca) are generally called "noble" truths, although one might also translate ariya as "precious", ") "pure". Paul Williams:

The Aryas are the noble ones, the saints, those who have attained 'the fruits of the path', 'that middle path the Tathagata has comprehended which promotes sight and knowledge, and which tends to peace, higher wisdom, enlightenment, and Nibbana'.

The term sacca (Sanskrit: satya) is a central term in Indian thought and religion. It is typically translated as "truth"; but it also means "that which is in accord with reality", or "reality". According to Buddhist scholar Rupert Gethin, the four truths are "four 'true things' or 'realities' whose nature, we are told, the Buddha finally understood on the night of his awakening." They function as "a convenient conceptual framework for making sense of Buddhist thought." According to K. R. Norman, probably the best translation is "the truth[s] of the noble one (the Buddha)". It is a statement of how things are seen by a Buddha, how things really are when seen correctly. It is the truthful way of seeing. (Note: '"Truth", satya (Sanskrit), sacca (Pali), derived from sat, being, how it is.) Through not seeing things this way, and behaving accordingly, we suffer.

=== Symbolic and propositional function ===
The Dharmacakra, often used to represent the Noble Eightfold Path

According to Anderson, the four truths have both a symbolic and a propositional function:

... the four noble truths are truly set apart within the body of the Buddha's teachings, not because they are by definition sacred, but because they are both a symbol and a doctrine and transformative within the sphere of right view. As one doctrine among others, the four noble truths make explicit the structure within which one should seek enlightenment; as a symbol, the four noble truths evoke the possibility of enlightenment. As both, they occupy not only a central but a singular position within the Theravada canon and tradition.

As a symbol, they refer to the possibility of awakening, as represented by the Buddha, and are of utmost importance:

[W]hen the four noble truths are regarded in the canon as the first teaching of the Buddha, they function as a view or doctrine that assumes a symbolic function. Where the four noble truths appear in the guise of a religious symbol in the Sutta-pitaka and the Vinaya-pitaka of the Pali canon, they represent the enlightenment experience of the Buddha and the possibility of enlightenment for all Buddhists within the cosmos.

As a proposition, they are part of the matrix or "network of teachings", in which they are "not particularly central", but have an equal place next to other teachings, describing how release from craving is to be reached. A long recognized feature of the Theravada canon is that it lacks an "overarching and comprehensive structure of the path to nibbana." The sutras form a network or matrix, and the four truths appear within this "network of teachings", which have to be taken together. Within this network, "the four noble truths are one doctrine among others and are not particularly central", but are a part of "the entire dhamma matrix". The four noble truths are set and learnt in that network, learning "how the various teachings intersect with each other", and refer to the various Buddhist techniques, which are all explicitly and implicitly part of the passages which refer to the four truths. According to Anderson,

There is no single way of understanding the teachings: one teaching may be used to explain another in one passage; the relationship may be reversed or altered in other talks.

== Explanation of the Four Truths ==
=== Dukkha and its ending ===
As a proposition, the four truths defy an exact definition, but refer to and express the basic orientation of Buddhism: sensory contact gives rise to clinging and craving to temporary states and things, which is ultimately unsatisfactory, dukkha, or which themselves are dukkha, "unreliable", "precarious", and sustains samsara, the repeated cycle of bhava (becoming, habitual tendencies) and jāti ("birth", interpreted as either rebirth, the coming to be of a new existence; or as the arising of the sense of self as a mental phenomenon). By following the Buddhist path, craving and clinging can be confined, peace of mind (nirvana) and real happiness can be attained, and the repeated cycle of repeated becoming and birth will be stopped.

The truth of dukkha, "unreliable", "precarious", "incapable of satisfying", "painful", from dush-stha, "standing unstable," is the basic insight that samsara, life in this "mundane world", with its clinging and craving to impermanent states and things is (or 'which are')dukkha, unsatisfactory and painful. We expect happiness from states and things which are impermanent, and therefore cannot attain real happiness.

The truth of samudaya, "arising", "coming together", or dukkha-samudaya, the origination or arising of dukkha, is the truth that samsara, and its associated dukkha arises, or continues, (Note: Gogerly (1861): "1. That sorrow is connected with existence in all its forms. 2. That its continuance results from a continued desire of existence.") with taṇhā, "thirst", craving for and clinging to these impermanent states and things. In the orthodox view, this clinging and craving produces karma, which leads to renewed becoming, keeping us trapped in rebirth and renewed dissatisfaction. (Note: According to Schmitthausen, as cited by James egge, the four truths do not mention karma, but solely declare craving to be the cause of misery and rebirth.) Craving includes kama-tanha, craving for sense-pleasures; bhava-tanha, craving to continue the cycle of life and death, including rebirth; and vibhava-tanha, craving to not experience the world and painful feelings. While dukkha-samudaya, the term in the basic set of the four truths, is traditionally translated and explained as "the origin (or cause) of suffering", giving a causal explanation of dukkha, David Brazier and author Stephen Batchelor point to the wider connotations of the term samudaya, "coming into existence together": together with dukkha arises tanha, thirst. Craving does not cause dukkha, but comes into existence together with dukkha, or the five skandhas. It is this craving which is to be confined, as Kondanna understood at the end of the Dhammacakkappavattana Sutta: "whatever arises ceases".

The truth of nirodha, "cessation," "suppression," "renouncing," "letting go", or dukkha-nirodha, the cessation of dukkha, is the truth that dukkha ceases, or can be confined, when one renounces or confines craving and clinging, and nirvana is attained. Alternatively, tanha itself, as a response to dukkha, is to be confined. Nirvana refers to the moment of attainment itself, and the resulting peace of mind and happiness (khlesa-nirvana), but also to the final dissolution of the five skandhas at the time of death (skandha-nirvana or parinirvana); in the Theravada-tradition, it also refers to a transcendental reality which is "known at the moment of awakening". According to Gethin, "modern Buddhist usage tends to restrict 'nirvāṇa' to the awakening experience and reserve 'parinirvāṇa' for the death experience. When nirvana is attained, no more karma is being produced, and rebirth and dissatisfaction will no longer arise again. Cessation is nirvana, "blowing out", and peace of mind. Vipassana teacher Joseph Goldstein explains:

Ajahn Buddhadasa, a well-known Thai master of the last century, said that when village people in India were cooking rice and waiting for it to cool, they might remark, "Wait a little for the rice to become nibbana". So here, nibbana means the cool state of mind, free from the fires of the defilements. As Ajahn Buddhadasa remarked, "The cooler the mind, the more Nibbana in that moment". We can notice for ourselves relative states of coolness in our own minds as we go through the day.

The truth of magga, refers to the path to the cessation of, or liberation from dukkha c.q. tanha. By following the Noble Eightfold Path, to moksha, liberation, restraining oneself, cultivating discipline, and practicing mindfulness and meditation, one starts to disengage from craving and clinging to impermanent states and things, and rebirth and dissatisfaction will be ended. The term "path" is usually taken to mean the Noble Eightfold Path, but other versions of "the path" can also be found in the Nikayas. The Theravada tradition regards insight into the four truths as liberating in itself.

The well-known eightfold path consists of the understanding that this world is fleeting and unsatisfying, and how craving keeps us tied to this fleeting world; a friendly and compassionate attitude to others; a correct way of behaving; mind-control, which means not feeding on negative thoughts, and nurturing positive thoughts; constant awareness of the feelings and responses which arise; and the practice of dhyana, meditation. The tenfold path adds the right (liberating) insight, and liberation from rebirth. (Note: Another variant, which may be condensed to the eightfold or tenfold path, starts with a Tathagatha entering this world. A layman hears his teachings, decides to leave the life of a householder, starts living according to the moral precepts, guards his sense-doors, practices mindfulness and the four jhanas, gains the three knowledges, understands the Four Noble Truths and destroys the taints, and perceives that he's liberated.)

The four truths are to be internalised, and understood or "experienced" personally, to turn them into a lived reality.

=== Ending rebirth ===
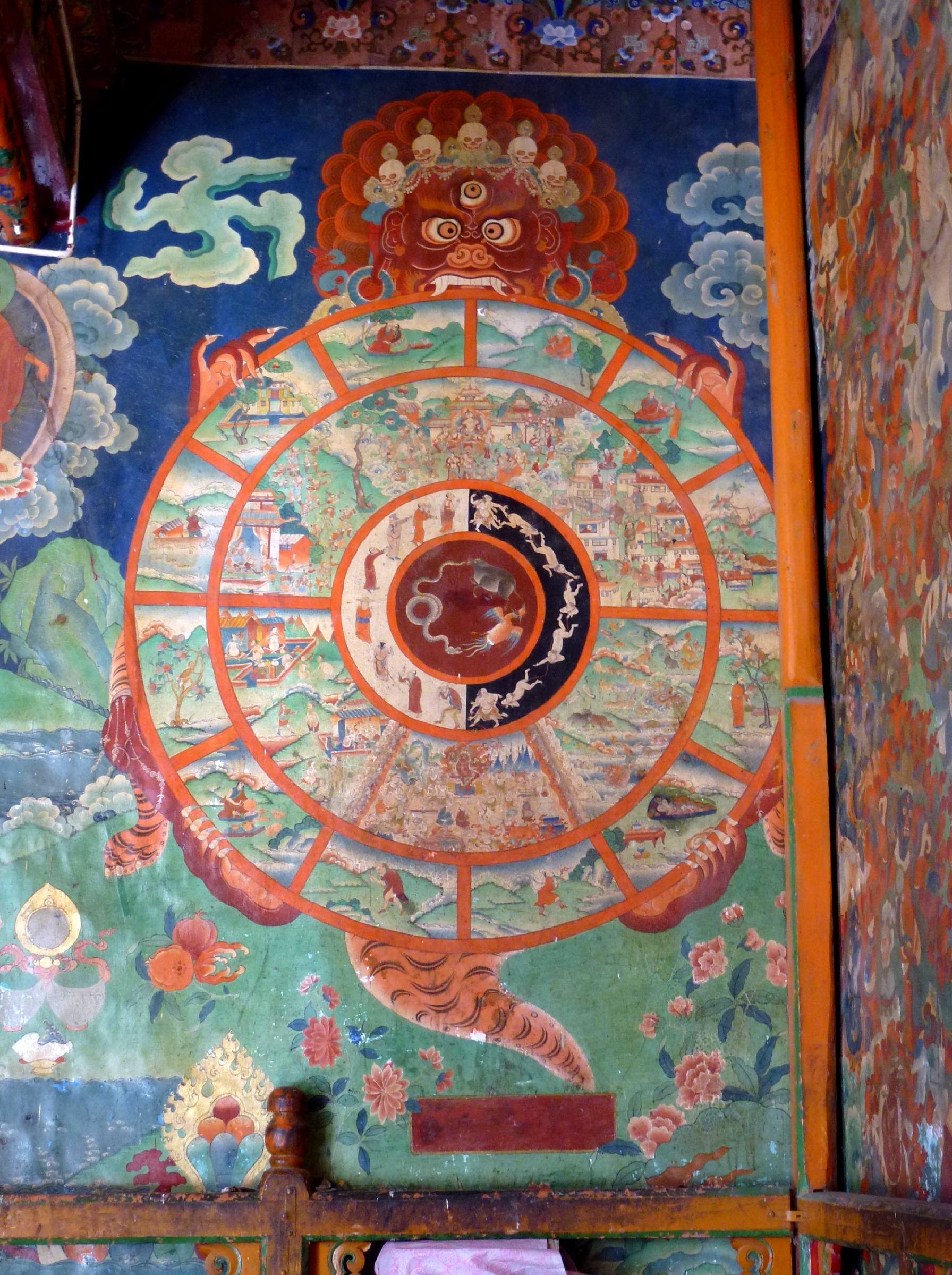
Tibetan Bhavacakra or "Wheel of Life"

The four truths describe dukkha and its ending as a means to reach peace of mind in this life, but also as a means to end rebirth.

According to ethnographer Geoffrey Samuel, "the Four Noble Truths [...] describe the knowledge needed to set out on the path to liberation from rebirth." By understanding the four truths, one can stop this clinging and craving, attain a pacified mind, and be freed from this cycle of rebirth and redeath. Indologist Patrick Olivelle explains that moksha is a central concept in Indian religions, and "literally means freedom from samsara." (Note: Patrick Olivelle: "Moksha, also spelled mokṣa, also called mukti, in Indian philosophy and religion, liberation from the cycle of death and rebirth (samsara). Derived from the Sanskrit word muc ("to free"), the term moksha literally means freedom from samsara. This concept of liberation or release is shared by a wide spectrum of religious traditions, including Hinduism, Buddhism, and Jainism.) According to indologist Fyodor Shcherbatskoy, the four truths are "a scheme for philosophical constructions," and it's topics, quoting 6th century philosopher Uddyotakara, "are investigated by every philosopher in every system of metaphysics." (Note: Fyodor Shcherbatskoy (1927), The Conception Of Buddhist Nirvana, p. 89.)

Cultural anthropologist Melford Spiro further explains that "desire is the cause of suffering because desire is the cause of rebirth." When desire ceases, rebirth and its accompanying suffering ceases. (Note: Melford E. Spiro: "Desire is the cause of suffering because desire is the cause of rebirth; and the extinction of desire leads to deliverance from suffering because it signals release from the Wheel of Rebirth.") Peter Harvey explains:

Once birth has arisen, "ageing and death", and various other dukkha states follow. While saying that birth is the cause of death may sound rather simplistic, in Buddhism it is a very significant statement; for there is an alternative to being born. This is to attain Nirvāna, so bringing an end to the process of rebirth and redeath. Nirvāna is not subject to time and change, and so is known as the 'unborn'; as it is not born it cannot die, and so it is also known as the "deathless". To attain this state, all phenomena subject to birth – the khandhas and nidānas – must be transcended by means of non-attachment.

The last sermon, the Maha-parinibbana Sutta (Last Days of the Buddha, Digha Nikaya 16)", states it as follows:

[...] it is through not realizing, through not penetrating the Four Noble Truths that this long course of birth and death has been passed through and undergone by me as well as by you [...] But now, bhikkhus, that these have been realized and penetrated, cut off is the craving for existence, destroyed is that which leads to renewed becoming [rebirth], and there is no fresh becoming.

=== Other interpretations ===
According to Bhikkhu Buddhadasa, "birth" does refer not to physical birth and death, but to the birth and death of our self-concept, the "emergence of the ego". According to Buddhadhasa,

... dependent arising is a phenomenon that lasts an instant; it is impermanent. Therefore, Birth and Death must be explained as phenomena within the process of dependent arising in everyday life of ordinary people. Right Mindfulness is lost during contacts of the Roots and surroundings. Thereafter, when vexation due to greed, anger, and ignorance is experienced, the ego has already been born. It is considered as one 'birth'".

Some contemporary teachers tend to explain the four truths psychologically, by taking dukkha to mean mental anguish in addition to the physical pain of life, and interpreting the four truths as a means to attain happiness in this life. In the contemporary Vipassana movement that emerged out of the Theravada Buddhism, freedom and the "pursuit of happiness" have become the main goals, not the end of rebirth, which is hardly mentioned in their teachings. (Note: The Vipassana-movement originated in colonial Burma, in response to the British colonial regime. While traditional Theravada saw little room for meditation practice, a subordinate role for lay Buddhists, and the attainment of nirvana as impossible in our times, reformists advocated the practice of meditation by lay Buddhists, as a means to preserve the pre-colonial order, which was based on Buddhism. Nirvana was suddenly deemed attainable, also for lay Buddhists. The Burmese reformists had a profound influence in the Theravada world, and also in the US since the 1970s, shaping the popular understanding of Buddhism. (Note: Eric Braun (2014), How colonialism sparked the global Vipassana movement Archived 7 October 2017 at the Wayback Machine))

Yet, though freedom and happiness is a part of the Buddhist teachings, these words refer to something different in traditional Asian Buddhism. According to Buddhist teacher Gil Fronsdal, "when Asian teachers do talk about freedom, it is primarily in reference to what one is free from – that is, from greed, hate, delusion, grasping, attachment, wrong view, self, and most significantly, rebirth". Nibbana is the final freedom, and it has no purpose beyond itself. In contrast, freedom in the creative modern interpretation of Four Noble Truths and the Eightfold Path means living happily and wisely, "without drastic changes in lifestyle". Such freedom and happiness is not the goal of Four Noble Truths and related doctrines within traditional Buddhism, but the vipassana teachings in the West make no reference to traditional Theravada doctrines, instead they present only the pragmatic and experiential goals in the form of therapy for the audience's current lives. The creative interpretations are driven in part because the foundational premises of Buddhism do not make sense to audiences outside of Asia. (Note: Stephen Batchelor states, "Such craving is at the root of greed, hatred, and bewilderment that prompt one to commit acts that cause one to be reborn after death in more or less favourable conditions in samsara. Although I have presented this formulation of the existential dilemma and its resolution in Buddhist terms, the same soteriological framework is shared by Hindus and Jains. (...) So embedded is this Indian soteriological framework in Buddhism that Buddhists might find it unintelligible that one would even consider questioning it. For to dispense with such key doctrines as rebirth, the law of kamma, and liberation from the cycle of birth and death would surely undermine the entire edifice of Buddhism itself. Yet for those who have grown up outside of Indian culture, who feel at home in a modernity informed by the natural sciences, to then be told that one cannot 'really' practise the dharma unless one adheres to the tenets of ancient Indian soteriology makes little sense. The reason people can no longer accept these beliefs need not be because they reject them as false, but because such views are too much at variance with everything else they know and believe about the nature of themselves and the world. They simply do not work anymore, and the intellectual gymnastics one needs to perform to make them work seem casuistic and, for many, unpersuasive. They are metaphysical beliefs, in that (like belief in God) they can neither be convincingly demonstrated nor refuted.") (Note: B. Alan Wallace states, "The Theravada Buddhist worldview is originally based on the Pali Buddhist canon, as interpreted by the great fifth-century commentator Buddhaghosa and later Buddhist scholars and contemplatives. For the immigrant Theravada Buddhist laity, the central feature of this worldview is the affirmation of the reality of reincarnation and karma. The possibility of achieving nirvana is primarily a concern for Buddhist monastics, while the laity are more concerned with avoiding karma that would propel them to a miserable rebirth, and with accumulating meritorious karma that will lead to a favorable rebirth and, in the long run, to ultimate liberation. (...) As a direct result of their belief in the efficacy of karma, Theravada lay Buddhists commonly make offerings of food, goods, and money to the ordained Sangha. Such meritorious conduct is thought to lead to a better rebirth either for themselves or for their deceased loved ones, depending on how the merit is dedicated by the person who performs this service.") According to Spiro, "the Buddhist message is not simply a psychological message", but an eschatological message.

== Historical development in early Buddhism ==
According to Anderson, "the four truths are recognized as perhaps the most important teaching of the Buddha." Yet, as early as 1935, translator Caroline Rhys Davids wrote that for a teaching so central to Theravada Buddhism, it was missing from critical passages in the Pali canon. This observation specifically concerned numerical listings, in particular the "Book of the Fours" in the Aṅguttara Nikāya. (Note: According to Anālayo, discourses on the four truths were systematically gathered in the Saccasaṁyutta of the Saṁyutta Nikāya, making their repetition in the Fours of the Aṅguttara Nikāya redundant.) According to Gethin, the four truths and the eightfold path are only two lists of "literally hundreds of similar lists covering the whole range of the theory and practice of ancient Buddhism." The position of the four truths within the canon raises questions, and has been investigated throughout the 19th and 20th centuries.

=== Scholarly analysis of the oldest texts ===
According to academic scholars, inconsistencies in the oldest texts may reveal developments in the oldest teachings. (Note: See: La Vallee Possin (1937), Musila et Narada; reprinted in Gombrich (2006), How Buddhism Began, appendix; Erich Frauwallner (1953), Geschichte der indischen Philosophie, Band Der Buddha und der Jina (pp. 147–272); Andre Bareau (1963), Recherches sur la biographiedu Buddha dans les Sutrapitaka et les Vinayapitaka anciens, Ecole Francaise d'Extreme-Orient; Schmithausen, On some Aspects of Descriptions or Theories of 'Liberating Insight' and 'Enlightenment' in Early Buddhism. In: Studien zum Jainismus und Buddhismus (Gedenkschrift für Ludwig Alsdorf), hrsg. von Klaus Bruhn und Albrecht Wezler, Wiesbaden 1981, 199–250.; Griffiths, Paul (1981), "Concentration or Insight; The Problematic of Theravada Buddhist Meditation-theory", The Journal of the American Academy of Religion (4): 605–624, doi:10.1093/jaarel/XLIX.4.605; K.R. Norman, Four Noble Truths; Bronkhorst 1993, chapter 8; Tilman Vetter (1988), The Ideas and Meditative Practices of Early Buddhism, by Tilmann Vetter; Richard F. Gombrich (2006) [1996]. How Buddhism Began: The Conditioned Genesis of the Early Teachings. Routledge. ISBN 978-1-134-19639-5., chapter four; Anderson 1999; Wynne 2007) While the Theravada-tradition holds that the Sutta Pitaka is "the definitive recension of the Buddha-word", and Theravadins argue that it is likely that the sutras date back to the Buddha himself, in an unbroken chain of oral transmission, (Note: Bhikkhu Sujato & Bhikkhu Brahmali, p. 4: "Most academic scholars of Early Buddhism cautiously affirm that it is possible that the EBTS contain some authentic sayings of the Buddha. We contend that this drastically understates the evidence. A sympathetic assessment of relevant evidence shows that it is very likely that the bulk of the sayings in the EBTS that are attributed to the Buddha were actually spoken by him. It is very unlikely that most of these sayings are inauthentic.) academic scholars have identified many such inconsistencies, and tried to explain them. Information of the oldest teachings of Buddhism, such as on the Four Noble Truths, has been obtained by analysis of the oldest texts and these inconsistencies, and are a matter of ongoing discussion and research. According to Buddhist scholar Lambert Schmithausen, three positions held by scholars of Buddhism can be distinguished regarding the possibility to retain knowledge of the oldest Buddhism:

1. "Stress on the fundamental homogeneity and substantial authenticity of at least a considerable part of the Nikayic materials;" (Note: Well-known proponents of the first position are: * A.K. Warder. According to A.K. Warder, in his 1970 publication "Indian Buddhism", from the oldest extant texts a common kernel can be drawn out, namely the Bodhipakkhiyādhammā. According to Warder, c.q. his publisher: "This kernel of doctrine is presumably common Buddhism of the period before the great schisms of the fourth and third centuries BC. It may be substantially the Buddhism of the Buddha himself, although this cannot be proved: at any rate it is a Buddhism presupposed by the schools as existing about a hundred years after the parinirvana of the Buddha, and there is no evidence to suggest that it was formulated by anyone else than the Buddha and his immediate followers." * Richard Gombrich: "I have the greatest difficulty in accepting that the main edifice is not the work of a single genius. By "the main edifice" I mean the collections of the main body of sermons, the four Nikāyas, and of the main body of monastic rules.")
2. "Scepticism with regard to the possibility of retrieving the doctrine of earliest Buddhism;" (Note: A proponent of the second position is Ronald Davidson: "While most scholars agree that there was a rough body of sacred literature (disputed)(sic) that a relatively early community (disputed)(sic) maintained and transmitted, we have little confidence that much, if any, of surviving Buddhist scripture is actually the word of the historic Buddha.")
3. "Cautious optimism in this respect." (Note: Well-known proponent of the third position are: * J.W. de Jong: "It would be hypocritical to assert that nothing can be said about the doctrine of earliest Buddhism [...] the basic ideas of Buddhism found in the canonical writings could very well have been proclaimed by him [the Buddha], transmitted and developed by his disciples and, finally, codified in fixed formulas." * Johannes Bronkhorst: "This position is to be preferred to (ii) for purely methodological reasons: only those who seek may find, even if no success is guaranteed." * Donald Lopez: "The original teachings of the historical Buddha are extremely difficult, if not impossible, to recover or reconstruct.")

=== Development ===
==== Growing importance ====
Buddhologist Eviatar Shulman proposes that in its original form the Four Truths were rooted in meditative perception of mental events, building on his analysis of the Pāli term ayam which is equivalent, he claims, to an immediate perception, such as this here right now in front of me.

Since the 19th century, scholars have argued that the formulation of the four truths was a later development in Buddhism. Linguist Léon Feer suggested in 1870 "the possibility that the four noble truths emerged into Buddhist literature through vinaya collections." Rhys-David noted in 1935 that the four truths are missing from the Fours in the Anguttara Nikaya. Buddhologist André Bareau argued in the 1960s that the four truths were not part of the Dhammacakkappavattana Sutta, as they were missing in important versions of it.

According to orientalist Johannes Bronkhorst, the four truths may already have been formulated in earliest Buddhism, but did not have the central place they acquired in later Buddhism. According to Anderson, only by the time of the commentaries, in the fifth century CE, did the four truths come to be identified in the Theravada tradition as the central teaching of the Buddha. (Note: Anderson: "However, the four noble truths do not always appear in stories of the Buddha's enlightenment where we might expect to find them. This feature may indicate that the four noble truths emerged into the canonical tradition at a particular point and slowly became recognized as the first teaching of the Buddha. Speculations about early and late teachings must be made relative to other passages in the Pali canon because of a lack of supporting extratextual evidence. Nonetheless, it is still possible to suggest a certain historical development of the four noble truths within the Pali canon. What we will find is a doctrine that came to be identified as the central teaching of the Buddha by the time of the commentaries in the fifth century C.E.") According to Anderson,

... the four noble truths were probably not part of the earliest strata of what came to be recognized as Buddhism, but that they emerged as a central teaching in a slightly later period that still preceded the final redactions of the various Buddhist canons.

According to Feer, followed by Anderson, the four truths probably entered the Sutta Pitaka from the Vinaya, the rules for monastic order. (Note: Anderson refers to Léon Feer, who already in 1870 "suggested the possibility that the four noble truths emerged into Buddhist literature through vinaya collections." She also refers to Bareau, who noticed the consistency between the two versions in the Mahavagga, part of the Vinaya, and the Dhammacakkappavattana-sutta of the Buddha's enlightenment: "As Bareau noted, the consistency between these two versions of the Buddha's enlightenment is an indication that the redactors of the Theravada canon probably brought the two accounts into agreement with each other at a relatively late point in the formation of the canon. Leon Feer had already suggested in 1870 that the versions of the four noble truths found in the sutras and suttas were derived from the vinaya rescensions in the larger body of Buddhist literature; Bareau's conclusion builds on this claim.") They were first added to enlightenment-stories which contain the Four Jhanas, replacing terms for "liberating insight". (Note: According to Schmithausen, in his often-cited article On some Aspects of Descriptions or Theories of 'Liberating Insight' and 'Enlightenment' in Early Buddhism, the mention of the four noble truths as constituting "liberating insight", which is attained after mastering the Rupa Jhanas, is a later addition to texts such as Majjhima Nikaya 36.) From there they were added to the biographical stories of the Buddha. (Note: Anderson refers to research by K.R. Norman, Bareau, Skilling, Schmithausen and Bronkhorst.)

According to Bhikkhu Anālayo's assessment, there is no compelling basis for questioning the traditional account that the four truths were the topic of the Buddha’s first sermon, arguing that they are present in other, parallel versions of the sutra and the canon. He argues that the presence of the Four Noble Truths at parallel versions supports their early and foundational role in early Buddhist doctrine. What remains uncertain, however, is how far these four truths were from the outset qualified as “noble.” (Note: Bronkhorst and Anderson follow Bareau, who argued in the 1960s that the four truths were not part of the Dhammacakkappavattana Sutta, as they were missing in important versions of it. His assessment has been questioned by Bhikkhu Anālayo, based on a comparative study and translation of a range of parallel versions of the Dhammacakkappavattana Sutta extant in Chinese. According to Analayo, the conclusion that the DS, accepted by him as "the first sermon", did not contain the four truths is erroneous, as it does not take into account extant parallels. Rhys-David noted in 1935 that the four truths are missing from the Fours in the Anguttara Nikaya. According to Analayo she overlooks the fact that discourses on this topic are instead allocated to the Sacca Saṃyutta of the Saṃyutta Nikāya. The Ariyapariyesanā Sutta (MN 26) narrates the Buddha's homeleaving and search, and his awakening. Anderson notes that the four truths are missing from this narrative, indicating that "the Ariyapariyesana-sutta shows that certain redactors of the canon conceived of the Buddha’s act of teaching without the four noble truths". According to Analayo, the expectation that the Ariyapariyesanā Sutta (MN 26) should give a full account of the Buddha’s teaching of the four noble truths is misplaced, as it is not a full-fledged biographical account, and has as its topic of the “noble search”, which does not require a complete coverage of the teaching given after this search was completed.)

==== Substituting "liberating insight" ====
Scholars have noted inconsistencies in the presentations of the Buddha's enlightenment, and the Buddhist path to liberation, in the oldest sutras. They argue that these inconsistencies show that the Buddhist teachings evolved, either during the lifetime of the Buddha, or thereafter. According to the Japanese scholar and Buddhist monk Ui Hakuju, the four truths are not the earliest representation of the Buddha's enlightenment. Instead, they are a rather late theory on the content of the Buddha's enlightenment. According to Tilman Vetter and Bronkhorst, the earliest Buddhist path consisted of a set of practices which culminate in the practice of dhyana, leading to a calm of mind and awareness (mindfulness) which according to Vetter is the liberation which is being sought. (Note: Note that dhyana is not the same as samatha, the calming of the mind by one-pointedly concentration. While dhyana also leads to a calm of mind, it aids in developing mindfulness, which is necessary to be aware of the arising of disturbing, selfish, thoughts and emotions, and to counter them. Wynne: "...the Buddha taught a 'middle way' between pure meditation and cognitive practices. The states of absorption induced by meditation were considered useful and necessary, but, in distinction from the meditative mainstream, their ultimate aim was insight. For the Buddha, it was vitally important that the meditative adept should apply his concentrative state to the practice of mindfulness (Sn 1070: satima; Sn 1111: ajjhattañ ca bahiddha ca nabhinandato; Sn 1113: ajjhattañ ca bahiddha ca natthi ti passato), and work towards the attainment of insight. According to this view, meditation alone, the goal of the meditative mainstream, would have been harshly criticized in the earliest Buddhism.") Later on, "liberating insight" came to be regarded as equally liberating. This "liberating insight" came to be exemplified by prajna, or the insight in the "four truths", but also by other elements of the Buddhist teachings. According to Vetter and Bronkhorst, this growing importance of "liberating insight" was a response to other religious groups in India, which held that a liberating insight was indispensable for moksha, liberation from rebirth. (Note: Tillmann Vetter: "Very likely the cause was the growing influence of a non-Buddhist spiritual environment·which claimed that one can be released only by some truth or higher knowledge. In addition the alternative (and perhaps sometimes competing) method of discriminating insight (fully established after the introduction of the four noble truths) seemed to conform so well to this claim." According to Bronkhorst, this happened under influence of the "mainstream of meditation", that is, Vedic-Brahmanical oriented groups, which believed that the cessation of action could not be liberating, since action can never be fully stopped. Their solution was to postulate a fundamental difference between the inner soul or self and the body. The inner self is unchangeable, and unaffected by actions. By insight into this difference, one was liberated. To equal this emphasis on insight, Buddhists presented insight into their most essential teaching as equally liberating. What exactly was regarded as the central insight "varied along with what was considered most central to the teaching of the Buddha.") This change is reflected in the canon, where, according to Bronkhorst,

...the accounts which include the Four Noble Truths had a completely different conception of the process of liberation than the one which includes the Four Dhyanas and the destruction of the intoxicants.

According to Vetter and Bronkhorst, the ideas about what exactly constituted this "liberating insight" were not fixed but developed over time. According to Bronkhorst, in earliest Buddhism the four truths did not serve as a description of "liberating insight". Initially the term prajna served to denote this "liberating insight". Later on, prajna was replaced in the suttas by the "four truths". This happened in those texts where practicing the four jhanas preceded the attainment of "liberating insight", and where this practice of the four jhanas then culminates in "liberating insight". This "liberating insight" came to be defined as "insight into the four truths", which is presented as the "liberating insight" which constituted the awakening, or "enlightenment" of the Buddha. When he understood these truths he was "enlightened" and liberated, (Note: "Enlightenment" is a typical western term, which bears its own, specific western connotations, meanings and interpretations.) as reflected in Majjhima Nikaya 26:42: "his taints are destroyed by his seeing with wisdom."

Bronkhorst points to an inconsistency, noting that the four truths refer here to the eightfold path as the means to gain liberation, while the attainment of insight into the four truths is portrayed as liberating in itself. According to Bronkhorst, this is an inconsistency which reveals a change which took place over time in the composition of the sutras. An example of this substitution, and its consequences, is Majjhima Nikaya 36:42–43, which gives an account of the awakening of the Buddha.

According to Schmithausen, the four truths were superseded by pratityasamutpada, and still later, in the Hinayana schools, by the doctrine of the non-existence of a substantial self or person. Schmithausen further states that still other descriptions of this "liberating insight" exist in the Buddhist canon:

"that the five Skandhas are impermanent, disagreeable, and neither the Self nor belonging to oneself"; (Note: Majjhima Nikaya 26) "the contemplation of the arising and disappearance (udayabbaya) of the five Skandhas"; (Note: Anguttara Nikaya II.45 (PTS)) "the realisation of the Skandhas as empty (rittaka), vain (tucchaka) and without any pith or substance (asaraka). (Note: Samyutta Nikaya III.140–142 (PTS))

In contrast, author Ṭhānissaro Bhikkhu presents the view that the four truths, pratityasamutpada and anatta are inextricably intertwined.

=== Acquiring the dhamma-eye and destroying the āsavās ===
In their symbolic function, the sutras present the insight into the four truths as the culmination of the Buddha's path to awakening. In the Vinayapitaka and the Sutta-pitaka they have the same symbolic function, in a reenactment by his listeners of the Buddha's awakening by attaining the dhamma-eye. In contrast, here this insight serves as the starting point to path-entry for his audience. These sutras present a repeated sequence of events:

1. Annupubbikathā ("graduated talk"), in which the Buddha explains the four truths; this talk frees the listener from the hindrances (see five hindrances and fetters);
2. This talk opens the dhammacakkhu ("dhamma eye"), and knowledge arises: "all that has the nature of arising has the nature of ending"; (Note: In effect to the exposition of the four truths, as presented in the Dhammacakkappavattana Sutta, the "dustless, stainless Dhamma eye" arose to Kondañña, stating: "Whatever is subject to origination is all subject to cessation.")
3. The request to become a member of the Buddhist order;
4. A second talk by the Buddha, which destroys the āsavās, impurities;
5. The statement that "there are now x arahats in the world."

Yet, in other sutras, where the four truths have a propositional function, the comprehension of the four truths destroys the corruptions. They do so in combination with the practice of the jhanas and the attainment of the divine eye, with which past lives and the working of rebirth are being seen.

According to Anderson, following Schmithausen and Bronkhorst, these two presentations give two different models of the path to liberation, reflecting their function as a symbol and as a proposition. Most likely, the four truths were first associated with the culmination of the path in the destruction of the āsavās, where they substituted the unspecified "liberating insight"; as the canon developed, they became more logically associated with the beginning of the Buddhist path.

=== Popularisation in the west ===
According to Anderson there is a strong tendency within scholarship to present the four truths as the most essential teaching of Buddhism. According to Anderson, the four truths have been simplified and popularized in western writings, due to "the colonial project of gaining control over Buddhism." According to Buddhist scholar Kate Crosby, the Buddhist teachings are reduced to a "simple, single rationalized account", which has parallels in the reinterpretation of the Buddha in western literature.

The presentation of the four truths as one of the most important teachings of the Buddha "has been [done] to reduce the four noble truths to a teaching that is accessible, pliable, and therefore readily appropriated by non-Buddhists." There is a great variety of teachings in the Buddhist literature, which may be bewildering for those who are unaware of this variety. The four truths are easily accessible in this regard, and are "readily [understood] by those outside the Buddhist traditions." For example Walpola Rahula Thera's What the Buddha Taught, a widely used introductory text for non-Buddhists, uses the four truths as a framework to present an overview of the Buddhist teachings.

According to Elizabeth Harris, the British in the 19th century crafted new representations of Buddhism and the Buddha. 19th century missionaries studied Buddhism, to be more effective in their missionary efforts. The Buddha was de-mystified, and reduced from a "superhuman" to a "compassionate, heroic human", serving "western historical method and the missionary agenda of situating the Buddha firmly below the divine." The four truths were discovered by the British by reading the Buddhist texts, and were not immediately granted the central position they later received.

The writings of British missionaries show a growing emphasis on the four truths as being central to Buddhism, with somewhat different presentations of them. (Note: Whereas Gogerly wrote in 1861 "That sorrow is connected with existence in all its forms [and] [t]hat its continuance results from a continued desire of existence", Spencer Hardy wrote in 1866 that "there is sorrow connected with every mode of existence; that the cause of sorrow is desire." Childers, drawing on Gogerly and Hardy, writes that "existence is suffering; human passion (tanhã – desire) is the cause of continued existence.") This colonial project had a strong influence on some strands of Buddhism, culminating in so-called Protestant Buddhism, which incorporated several essentially Protestant attitudes regarding religion, such as the emphasis on written texts. According to Robert Gimello, Rahula's book is an example of this Protestant Buddhism, and "was created in an accommodating response to western expectations, and in nearly diametrical opposition to Buddhism as it had actually been practised in traditional Theravada." (Note: Gimello (2004), as quoted in Taylor (2007).)

Linguist Hendrik Kern proposed in 1882 that the model of the four truths may be an analogy with classical Indian medicine, in which the four truths function as a medical diagnosis, and the Buddha is presented as a physician. (Note: Kern's model: 1. The truth of dukkha: identifying the illness and the nature of the illness (the diagnosis); 2. The truth of origin: identifying the causes of the illness; 3. The truth of cessation: identifying a cure for the illness (the prognosis); 4. The truth of the path: recommending a treatment for the illness that can bring about a cure (the prescription)) Kern's analogy became rather popular. (Note: See,) According to Anderson, "there is not sufficient historical evidence to conclude that the Buddha deliberately drew upon a clearly defined medical model for his fourfold analysis of human pain", though Anālayo deems it "possible that the Buddhist texts preserve a record of what at that time was a diagnostic scheme known and in use in daily life at the popular level".

According to Anderson, those scholars who did not place the four truths at the center of Buddhism, either "located the four truths in a fuller reading of the Theravada canon and the larger context of South Asian literature", or "located the teaching within an experience of Buddhism as practiced in a contemporary setting." According to Anderson, "these authors suggest a more complex reading of the four noble truths than those who locate the teaching as the key to or as a crucial element within the grand scheme of Buddhism."

== Appearance within the discourses ==
The developing Buddhist tradition inserted the four truths, using various formulations, at various sutras. They are being used both as a symbol of all dhammas and the Buddha's awakening, and as a set of propositions which function within a matrix of teachings. According to Anderson, there is no single way to understand the teachings; one teaching may be used to explain another teaching, and vice versa. The teachings form a network, which should be apprehended as such to understand how the various teachings intersect with each other.

=== Symbolic function ===
==== Mahasaccaka Sutta ====
The Mahasaccaka Sutta ("The Greater Discourse to Saccaka", Majjhima Nikaya 36) gives one of several versions of the Buddha's way to liberation. (Note: Majjhima Nikaya 26, "The Noble Search", also gives an account, which is markedly different, omitting the ascetic practices and the four truths.) He attains the three knowledges, namely knowledge of his former lifes, knowledge of death and rebirth, and knowledge of the destruction of the taints, (Note: Which keep one trapped in samsara.) the Four Noble Truths. After going through the four dhyanas, and gaining the first two knowledges, the story proceeds:

I directed my mind to the knowledge of the destruction of the intoxicants [suffering ... origin ... cessation ... path] [intoxicants (asava) ... origin ... cessation ... path] My mind was liberated [...] the knowledge arose that it was liberated.

Bronkhorst dismisses the first two knowledges as later additions, and proceeds to notice that the recognition of the intoxicants is modelled on the four truths. According to Bronkhorst, those are added the bridge the original sequence of "I directed my mind to the knowledge of the destruction of the intoxicants. My mind was liberated", which was interrupted by the addition of the four truths. Bronkhorst points out that those do not fit here, since the four truths culminate in the knowledge of the path to be followed, while the Buddha himself is already liberated at that point.

==== Dhammacakkappavattana Sutta ====
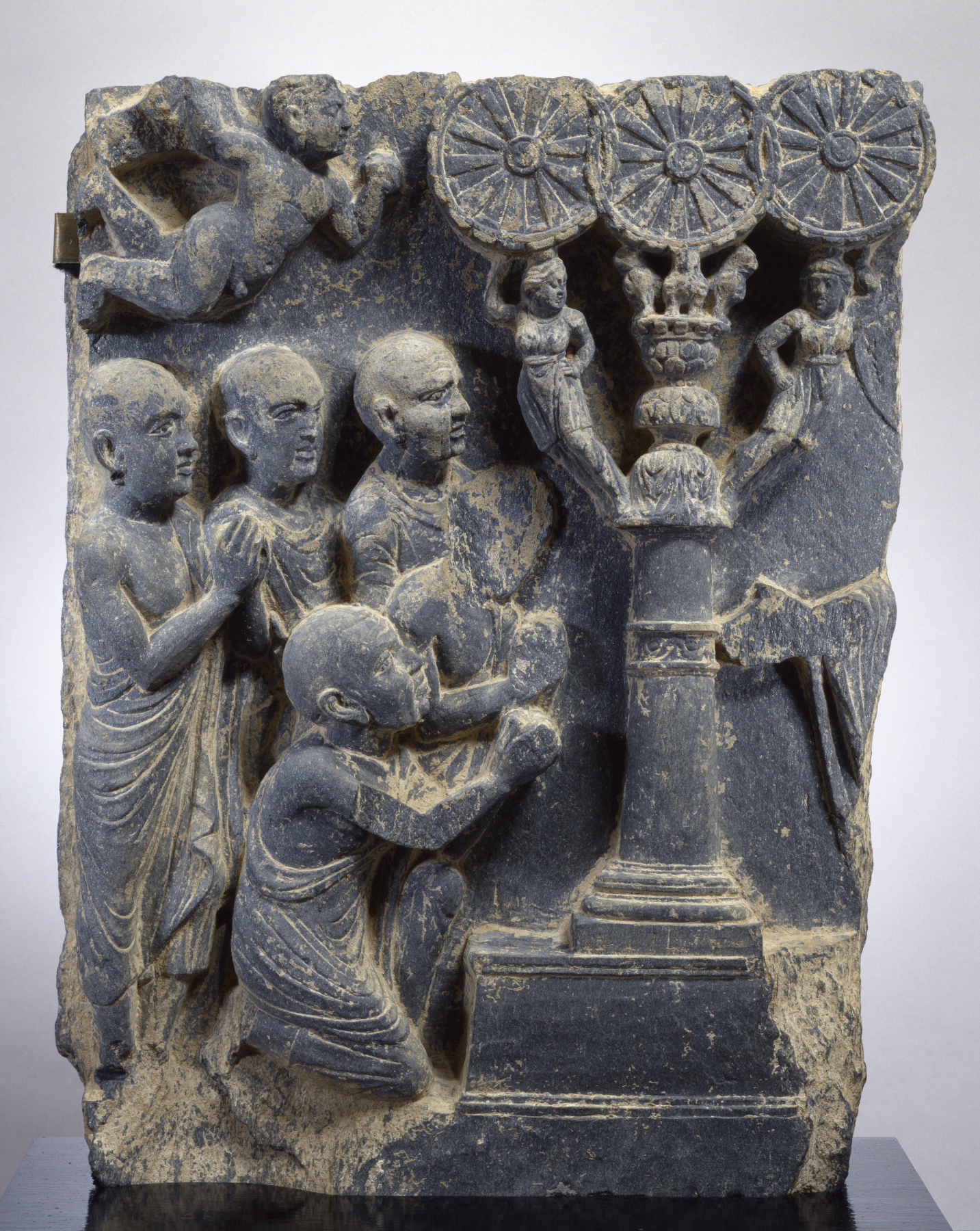
A relief depicting the first discourse of the Buddha, from the 2nd century (Kushan). (Note: Expounding the Law, The Walters Art Museum) The Walters Art Museum. The Buddha's hand can be seen at right.

According to the Buddhist tradition, the first talk of Gautama Buddha after he attained enlightenment is recorded in the Dhammacakkappavattana Sutta ("Setting in Motion the Wheel of Dhamma", Samyutta Nikaya 56.11). The Dhammacakkappavattana Sutta provides details on three stages in the understanding of each truth, for a total of twelve insights. The three stages for understanding each truth are:

1. sacca-ñāṇa – knowing the nature of the truth (e.g., acknowledgement, view, reflection)
2. kicca-ñāṇa – knowing what needs to be done in connection with that truth (e.g., practice; motivation; directly experiencing)
3. kata-ñāṇa – accomplishing what needs to be done (e.g., result, full understanding, knowing)

These three stages of understanding are emphasized particularly in the Theravada tradition, but they are also recognized by some contemporary Mahayana teachers.

According to Cousins, many scholars are of the view that "this discourse was identified as the first sermon of the Buddha only at a later date." According to Stephen Batchelor, the Dhammacakkappavattana Sutta contains incongruities, and states that

The First Discourse cannot be treated as a verbatim transcript of what the Buddha taught in the Deer Park, but as a document that has evolved over an unspecified period of time until it reached the form in which it is found today in the canons of the different Buddhist schools.

According to Bronkhorst this "first sermon" is recorded in several sutras, with important variations. In the Vinaya texts, and in the Dhammacakkappavattana Sutta which was influenced by the Vinaya texts, the four truths are included, and Kondañña is enlightened when the "vision of Dhamma" arises in him: "whatever is subject to origination is all subject to cessation." (Note: Translation Bhikkhu Bodhi (2000), Samyutta Nikaya, SN 56.11, p. 1846. See also Anderson (2001), Pain and its Ending, p. 69.) Yet, in the Ariyapariyesanā Sutta ("The Noble Search", Majjhima Nikaya 26) the four truths are not included, (Note: MN 26.17 merely says "[']This will serve for the striving of a clansman intent on striving.' And I sat down there thinking: 'This will serve for striving.' According to Bhikkhu Bodhi Majjhima Nikaya 36 then continuous with the extreme ascetic practices, which are omitted in MN 26. In verse 18, the Buddha has attained Nirvana, being secured from bondage by birth, ageing, sickness and death, referring to the truths of dependent origination and "the stilling of all formations, the relinquishing of all attachments, the destruction of craving, dispassion, cessation.") and the Buddha gives the five ascetics personal instructions in turn, two or three of them, while the others go out begging for food. The versions of the "first sermon" which include the four truths, such as the Dhammacakkappavattana Sutta, omit this instruction, showing that

...the accounts which include the Four Noble Truths had a completely different conception of the process of liberation than the one which includes the Four Dhyanas and the subsequent destruction of the intoxicants.

According to Bronkhorst, this indicates that the four truths were later added to earlier descriptions of liberation by practicing the four dhyanas, which originally was thought to be sufficient for the destruction of the arsavas. Anderson also thinks that the four truths originally were not part of this sutta, and were later added in some versions. (Note: Anderson follows Norman's analysis, but also other scholar's critiques. According to Cousins, Anderson misunderstands Norman in this respect, but does "not think that this misunderstanding of Norman's position critically affects Anderson's thesis. Even if these arguments do not prove that the four truths are definitely a later insertion in the Dhammacakkapavattana-sutta, it is certainly possible to take the position that the sutta itself is relatively late.") (Note: According to Analayo, comparative textual studies indicate that textual variations concern specific phrasing rather than the presence of the core teaching itself; Anālayo notes that while the Ekottarika Āgama omits the epithet “noble,” the underlying structure of the four truths remains consistently present.)

According to Bronkhorst, the "twelve insights" are probably also a later addition, born out of unease with the substitution of the general term "prajna" for the more specific "four truths".

==== Maha-parinibbana Sutta ====
According to the Buddhist tradition, the Maha-parinibbana Sutta (Last Days of the Buddha, Digha Nikaya 16) was given near the end of the Buddha's life. This sutta "gives a good general idea of the Buddha's Teaching:"

And the Blessed One addressed the bhikkhus, saying: "Bhikkhus, it is through not realizing, through not penetrating the Four Noble Truths that this long course of birth and death has been passed through and undergone by me as well as by you. What are these four? They are the noble truth of suffering; the noble truth of the origin of suffering; the noble truth of the cessation of suffering; and the noble truth of the way to the cessation of suffering. But now, bhikkhus, that these have been realized and penetrated, cut off is the craving for existence, destroyed is that which leads to renewed becoming, and there is no fresh becoming."

Thus it was said by the Blessed One. And the Happy One, the Master, further said:

Through not seeing the Four Noble Truths,
Long was the weary path from birth to birth.
When these are known, removed is rebirth's cause,
The root of sorrow plucked; then ends rebirth.

=== Propositional function ===
==== Maha-salayatanika Sutta ====
The Maha-salayatanika Sutta, Majjhima Nikaya 149:3 plus 149:9, give an alternative presentation of the four truths:

When one abides inflamed by lust, fettered, infatuated, contemplating gratification, [...] [o]ne's bodily and mental troubles increase, one's bodily and mental torments increase, one's bodily and mental fevers increase, and one experiences bodily and mental suffering.

...when one does not know and see as it actually is [the feeling] felt as pleasant or painful or neither painful-nor-pleasant that arises with eye-contact as condition, then one is inflamed by lust for the eye, for forms, for eye-consciousness, for eye-contact, for [the feeling] felt as pleasant or painful or neither painful-nor-pleasant that arises with eye-contact as condition [repeated for the nose, tongue, body, mind].

When one abides uninflamed by lust, unfettered, uninfatuated, contemplating danger [...] one's craving [...] is abandoned. One's bodily and mental troubles are abandoned, one's bodily and mental torments are abandoned, one's bodily and mental fevers are abandoned, and one experiences bodily and mental pleasure.

...when one knows and see as it actually is [the feeling] felt as pleasant or painful or neither painful-nor-pleasant that arises with eye-contact as condition, then one is not inflamed by lust for the eye, for forms, for eye-consciousness, for eye-contact, for [the feeling] felt as pleasant or painful or neither painful-nor-pleasant that arises with eye-contact as condition [repeated for the nose, tongue, body, mind].

== Emphasis within different traditions ==
=== Early Indian Buddhism ===
The Ekavyāvahārika sect emphasized the transcendence of the Buddha, asserting that he was eternally enlightened and essentially non-physical. According to the Ekavyāvahārika, the words of the Buddha were spoken with one transcendent meaning, and the Four Noble Truths are to be understood simultaneously in one moment of insight. According to the Mahīśāsaka sect, the Four Noble Truths should be meditated upon simultaneously.

=== Theravada ===
According to Carol Anderson, the four truths have "a singular position within the Theravada canon and tradition." (Note: According to Ooi & Skilling (2026, pp. 140–141), the four truths are not particular to any one school. They are shared by all the known Āgama and Sūtra traditions and by the surviving Vinayas. Several scholastic systems set them out: a Vaibhāṣika analysis in the Abhidharmakośa, a Sāṃmitīya one recorded by Daśabalaśrīmitra and surviving in Tibetan translation, the Mūlasarvāstivāda Saṅghabhedavastu in Sanskrit, and the Sarvāstivāda Vinaya in Chinese. Mahāyāna works elaborate on them in turn, among them the Prajñāpāramitās and the Akṣayamatinirdeśa.) The Theravada tradition regards insight in the four truths as liberating in itself. As Walpola Rahula states, "when the Truth is seen, all the forces which feverishly produce the continuity of samsara in illusion become calm and incapable of producing any more karma-formations [...] he is free from [...] the 'thirst' for becoming." (Note: Walpola Rahula: "When wisdom is developed and cultivated according to the Fourth Noble Truth (the next to be taken up), it sees the secret of life, the reality of things as they are. When the secret is discovered, when the Truth is seen, all the forces which feverishly produce the continuity of saṃsāra in illusion become calm and incapable of producing any more karma-formations, because there is no more illusion, no more 'thirst' for continuity."; "The remaining two factors, namely Right Thought and Right Understanding go to constitute Wisdom."; "Right Understanding is the understanding of things as they are, and it is the Four Noble Truths that explain things as they really are. Right Understanding therefore is ultimately reduced to the understanding of the Four Noble Truths. This understanding is the highest wisdom which sees the Ultimate Reality.") This liberation can be attained in one single moment, when the four truths are understood together. Within the Theravada tradition, great emphasis is placed upon reading and contemplating The Discourse That Sets Turning the Wheel of Truth, and other suttas, as a means to study the four noble truths and put them into practice. For example, Buddhist monk Ajahn Sumedho states:

The Dhammacakkappavattana Sutta, the Buddha's teaching on the Four Noble Truths, has been the main reference that I have used for my practice over the years. It is the teaching we used in our monastery in Thailand. The Theravada school of Buddhism regards this sutta as the quintessence of the teachings of the Buddha. This one sutta contains all that is necessary for understanding the Dhamma and for enlightenment."

Within the Theravada-tradition, three different stances on nirvana and the question what happens with the Arhat after death can be found. Nirvana refers to the cessation of the defilements and the resulting peace of mind and happiness (khlesa-nirvana); to the final dissolution of the five skandhas at the time of death (skandha-nirvana or parinirvana); and to a transcendental reality which is "known at the moment of awakening". (Note: Gethin: "(I) it is the extinguishing of the defilements of greed, hatred, and delusion; (2) it is the final condition of the Buddha and arhats after death consequent upon the extinction of the defilements; (3) it is the unconditioned realm known at the moment of awakening.) According to Gethin, "modern Buddhist usage tends to restrict 'nirvāṇa' to the awakening experience and reserve 'parinirvāṇa' for the death experience. According to systematic theologian Norman Geisler and J. Yutaka Amano, in the "minimal Theravada interpretation", nirvana is a psychological state, which ends with the dissolution of the body and the total extinction of existence. According to Geisler and Amano, the "orthodox Theravada interpretation" is that nirvana is a transcendent reality with which the self unites. According to Bronkhorst, while "Buddhism preached liberation in this life, i.e. before death", there was also a tendency in Buddhism to think of liberation happening after death. According to Bronkhorst, this

...becomes visible in those canonical passages which distinguish between Nirvana—qualified in Sanskrit and pali as "without a remainder of upadhi/upadi" (anupadhisesa/anupadisesa)—and the "highest and complete enlightenment" (anuttara samyaksambodhi/sammasambodhi). The former occurs at death, the latter in life.

According to Walpola Rahula, the cessation of dukkha is nirvana, the summum bonum of Buddhism, and is attained in this life, not when one dies. Nirvana is "perfect freedom, peace, tranquility and happiness", and "Absolute Truth", which simply is. (Note: According to Rahula, in What the Buddha Taught,... if Nirvāṇa is to be expressed and explained in positive terms, we are likely immediately to grasp an idea associated with those terms, which may be quite the contrary. Therefore it is generally expressed in negative terms." According to Gombrich this distinction between apophatic and cataphatic approaches can be found in all religions. Rahula gives an overview of negative statements of nirvana, whereafter he states: Because Nirvana is thus expressed in negative terms, there are many who have got a wrong notion that it is negative, and expresses self-annihilation. Nirvāṇa is definitely no annihilation of self, because there is no self to annihilate. If at all, it is the annihilation of the illusion of the false idea of self. It is incorrect to say that Nirvāṇa is negative or positive. The ideas of 'negative' and 'positive' are relative, and are within the realm of duality. These terms cannot be applied to Nirvāṇa, Absolute Truth, which is beyond duality and relativity [...] Nirvāṇa is neither cause nor effect. It is beyond cause and effect. Truth is not a result nor an effect. It is not produced like a mystic, spiritual, mental state, such as dhyāna or samādhi. TRUTH IS. NIRVĀṆA IS. Rahula refers to the Dhātuvibhaṅga-sutta (the Majjhima-nikāya 140) for his interpretation of "Nirvāṇa as Absolute Truth", which, according to Rahula, says: O bhikkhu, that which is unreality (mosadhamma) is false; that which is reality (amosadhamma), Nibbāna, is Truth (Sacca). Therefore, O bhikkhu, a person so endowed is endowed with this Absolute Truth. For, the Absolute Noble Truth (paramaṃ ariyasaccaṃ) is Nibbāna, which is Reality.' While Buddhist philosopher K. N. Jayatilleke translates amosadhamma as "ineffable", Thanissaro Bhikkhu gives a somewhat different translation: His release, being founded on truth, does not fluctuate, for whatever is deceptive is false; Unbinding—the undeceptive—is true. Thus a monk so endowed is endowed with the highest determination for truth, for this—Unbinding, the undeceptive—is the highest noble truth. In response to Rahula, Richard Gombrich states that: In proclaiming (in block capitals) that 'Truth is', Rahula has for a moment fallen into Upanisadic mode. Since truth can only be a property of propositions, which have subjects and predicates, and nirvana is not a proposition, it makes no sense in English to say that nirvana is truth. The confusion arises, perhaps, because the Sanskrit word satyam and the corresponding Pali word saccam can indeed mean either 'truth' or 'reality'. But in our language this will not work. Richard Gombrich also states that Rahula's book would more aptly be titled What Buddhagosa Taught. According to David Kalupahana, Buddhagosa was influenced by Mahayana Buddhism, and introduced "the substantialist as well as essentialist standpoints of the Sarvastavadins and Sautrantikas.") Buddhist philosopher K. N. Jayatilleke also speaks of "the attainment of an ultimate reality". According to Bhikkhu Bodhi, the "elimination of craving culminates not only in the extinction of sorrow, anguish and distress, but in the unconditioned freedom of nibbana, which is won with the ending of repeated rebirth."

According to Spiro, most (lay) Theravada Buddhists do not aspire for nirvana and total extinction, but for a pleasurable rebirth in heaven. According to Spiro, this presents a "serious conflict" since the Buddhist texts and teaching "describe life as suffering and hold up nirvana as the summum bonum." In response to this deviation, "monks and others emphasize that the hope for nirvana is the only legitimate action for Buddhist action." Nevertheless, according to Spiro most Burmese lay Buddhists do not aspire for the extinction of existence which is nirvana.

According to B.R. Ambedkar, the Indian Buddhist Dalit leader, the four truths were not part of the original teachings of the Buddha, but a later aggregation, due to Hindu influences. According to Ambedkar, total cessation of suffering is an illusion; yet, the Buddhist Middle Path aims at the reduction of suffering and the maximizing of happiness, balancing both sorrow and happiness.

Stone wheels of the law made in Dvaravati-period Thailand carry the passage that sets them out in three phases and twelve aspects. The keywords of a sixteen-aspect analysis are cut on the spokes of one such wheel from Chai Nat. A stone slab found in 1991 at Cave II in Bagh, Madhya Pradesh, sets them out in a Middle Indic language.

=== Mahayana ===
The four truths are less prominent in the Mahayana traditions, which emphasize insight into Śūnyatā and the Bodhisattva path as a central elements in their teachings. If the sutras in general are studied at all, it is through various Mahayana commentaries.

According to John J Makransky, the Mahayana Bodhisattva ideal created tensions in the explanation of the four truths. In the Mahayana view, a fully enlightened Buddha does not leave samsara, but remains in the world out of compassion for all sentient beings. The four truths, which aim at ending samsara, do not provide a doctrinal basis for this view, and had to be reinterpreted. In the old view, klesas and karma are the cause of prolonged existence. According to Makransky, "[t]o remove those causes was, at physical death, to extinguish one's conditioned existence, hence to end forever one's participation in the world (Third Truth)." According to Makransky, the question of how a liberated being can still be "pervasively operative in this world" has been "a seminal source of ongoing doctrinal tension over Buddhahood throughout the history of the Mahayana in India and Tibet."

==== Tibetan Buddhism ====
10th century religious teacher Atisha, in his Bodhipathapradīpa ("A Lamp for the Path to Awakening"), which forms the basis for the Lamrim tradition, discerns three levels of motivation for Buddhist practitioners. At the beginning level of motivation, one strives toward a better life in samsara. At the intermediate level, one strives to a liberation from existence in samsara and the end of all suffering. At the highest level of motivation, one strives after the liberation of all living beings. In his commentary on the text, Tsenshap Serkong Rinpoche explains that the four truths are to be meditated upon as a means of practice for the intermediate level.

According to abbot Geshe Tashi Tsering, within Tibetan Buddhism, the four noble truths are studied as part of the Bodhisattva path. They are explained in Mahayana commentaries such as the Abhisamayalamkara, a summary of and commentary on the Prajna Paramita sutras, where they form part of the lower Hinayana teachings. The truth of the path (the fourth truth) is traditionally presented according to a progressive formula of five paths, rather than as the eightfold path presented in Theravada. According to Tsering, the study of the four truths is combined with the study of the sixteen characteristics of the four noble truths.

Some contemporary Tibetan Buddhist teachers have provided commentary on the Dhammacakkappavattana Sutta and the noble eightfold path when presenting the dharma to Western students.

The truths are used extensively within Sowa Rigpa (traditional Tibetan medicine) theory.

===== Tiantai interpretation =====
The Tiantai school gives a hierarchical categorisation of the Buddhist Four Teachings: Tripitaka (the basic teachings of Sutra, Vinaya and Abhidharma), Shared (emptiness, shared by Mahayana and Theravāda), Separate (Mahayana-teachings of the Bodhisattva path), and Perfect, the complete and perfect teaching beyond words and concepts of the Lotus Sutra and the Avatamsaka Sutra. Each category gives a distinct way of understanding thr Four Truths. In the Tripitaka teaching, the Four Truths describe what is concretely arising and ceasing. The Shared teaching states that essentially there is no arising and ceasing The Separate teaching states that the Four Truths can be described in endless alternate ways, for the sake of the liberative work of the Bodhisattva. The Perfect teaching explains the Four Truths in terms of emptiness, concrete existence, and the middle position between those two, reflecting the idea that everything that exists contains everything else within it.

==== Nichiren Buddhism ====
Nichiren Buddhism is based on the teaching of the 13th century Japanese priest and teacher Nichiren, who believed that the Lotus Sūtra contained the essence of all of Gautama Buddha's teachings. The third chapter of the Lotus Sutra states that the Four Noble Truths was the early teaching of the Buddha, while the Dharma of the Lotus is the "most wonderful, unsurpassed great Dharma". The teachings on the four noble truths are a provisional teaching, which Shakyamuni Buddha taught according to the people's capacity, while the Lotus Sutra is a direct statement of Shakyamuni's own enlightenment. (Note: Four Noble truths for Voice Hearers, see "Background" section)

=== Western Buddhism ===
For many western Buddhists, the rebirth doctrine in the Four Noble Truths teaching is a problematic notion. (Note: Bhikkhu Bodhi, Does Rebirth Make Sense?) (Note: See also: * James Ford, The Karma and Rebirth Debate Within Contemporary Western Buddhism: Some Links to Follow * Manon Welles, Secular Buddhism vs. Traditional Buddhism: 6 Key Differences * Alan Peta, Reincarnation and Buddhism: Here We Go Again) According to Christopher Lamb, "Certain forms of modern western Buddhism [...] see it as purely mythical and thus a dispensable notion." According to James William Coleman, the focus of most vipassana students in the west "is mainly on meditation practice and a kind of down-to-earth psychological wisdom." (Note: According to Coleman, the goal in Theravada Buddhism "is to uproot the desires and defilements in order to attain nibbana (nirvana in Sanskrit) and win liberation from the otherwise endless round of death and rebirth. But few Western Vipassana teachers pay much attention to the more metaphysical aspects of such concepts as rebirth and nibbana, and of course very few of their students are celibate monks. Their focus is mainly on meditation practice and a kind of down-to-earth psychological wisdom. "As a result," one respected Vipassana teacher writes, "many more Americans of European descent refer to themselves as Vipassana students rather than as students of Theravada Buddhism.") According to bioethicist Damien Keown, westerners find "the ideas of karma and rebirth puzzling." According to Christopher Gowans, many Western followers and people interested in exploring Buddhism are skeptical and object to the belief in karma and rebirth foundational to the Four Noble Truths. (Note: Gowans groups the objections into three categories. The first objection can be called "consistency objection", which asks if "there is no self (atman, soul), then what is reborn and how does karma work?". The second objection can be called "naturalism objection", which asks "can rebirth be scientifically proven, what evidence is there that rebirth happens". The third objection can be called "morality objection", which asks "why presume that an infant born with an illness, is because of karma in previous life" as seems implied by Majjhima Nikāya section 3.204 for example. Gowans provides a summary of prevailing answers, clarifications and explanations proffered by practicing Buddhists.) According to Adrian Konik,

Since the fundamental problems underlying early Indian Buddhism and contemporary western Buddhism are not the same, the validity of applying the set of solutions developed by the first to the situation of the second becomes a question of great importance. Simply putting an end to rebirth would not necessarily strike the western Buddhist as the ultimate answer, as it certainly was for early Indian Buddhists.

According to Keown, it is possible to reinterpret the Buddhist doctrines such as the Four Noble Truths, since the final goal and the answer to the problem of suffering is nirvana, and not rebirth. Some Western interpreters have proposed what is sometimes referred to as "naturalized Buddhism". It is devoid of rebirth, karma, nirvana, realms of existence, and other concepts of Buddhism, with doctrines such as the Four Noble Truths reformulated and restated in modernistic terms. (Note: Prothereo describes how Theosophist Henry Steel Olcott (1832–1907) reinterpreted Buddhism: "In addition to a restatement of the Four Noble Truths and the Five Precepts for lay Buddhists, the fourteen propositions included: an affirmation of religious tolerance and of the evolution of the universe, a rejection of supernaturalism, heaven or hell, and superstition, and an emphasis on education and the use of reason.") (Note: According to Owen Flanagan, the proportion of people in North America that believe in heaven is about the same as the proportion of East and Southeast Asia who believe in rebirth. But, 'rebirth' is considered superstitious by many in the West while 'heaven' is not, adds Flanagan, though a reflective naturalistic approach demands that both 'heaven' and 'rebirth' be equally questioned". According to Donald S. Lopez, Buddhist movements in the West have reconstructed a "Scientific Buddha" and a "modern Buddhism" unknown in Asia, "one that may never have existed there before the late 19-century".) This "deflated secular Buddhism" stresses compassion, impermanence, causality, selfless persons, no Boddhisattvas, no nirvana, no rebirth, and a naturalist's approach to well-being of oneself and others.

According to Melford Spiro, this approach undermines the Four Noble Truths, for it does not address the existential question for the Buddhist as to "why live? why not commit suicide, hasten the end of dukkha in current life by ending life". In traditional Buddhism, rebirth continues the dukkha and the path to cessation of dukkha isn't suicide, but the fourth reality of the Four Noble Truths. The "naturalized Buddhism", according to Gowans, is a radical revision to traditional Buddhist thought and practice, and it attacks the structure behind the hopes, needs and rationalization of the realities of human life to traditional Buddhists in East, Southeast and South Asia. According to Keown, it may not be necessary to believe in some of the core Buddhist doctrines to be a Buddhist, but the rebirth, karma, realms of existence and cyclic universe doctrines underpin the Four Noble Truths in Buddhism.

Traditional Buddhist scholars disagree with these modernist Western interpretations. Bhikkhu Bodhi, for example, states that rebirth is an integral part of the Buddhist teachings as found in the sutras, despite the problems that "modernist interpreters of Buddhism" seem to have with it. (Note: Bhikkhu Bodhi: "Newcomers to Buddhism are usually impressed by the clarity, directness, and earthy practicality of the Dhamma as embodied in such basic teachings as the Four Noble Truths, the Noble Eightfold Path, and the threefold training. These teachings, as clear as day-light, are accessible to any serious seeker looking for a way beyond suffering. When, however, these seekers encounter the doctrine of rebirth, they often balk, convinced it just doesn't make sense. At this point, they suspect that the teaching has swerved off course, tumbling from the grand highway of reason into wistfulness and speculation. Even modernist interpreters of Buddhism seem to have trouble taking the rebirth teaching seriously. Some dismiss it as just a piece of cultural baggage, "ancient Indian metaphysics", that the Buddha retained in deference to the world view of his age. Others interpret it as a metaphor for the change of mental states, with the realms of rebirth seen as symbols for psychological archetypes. A few critics even question the authenticity of the texts on rebirth, arguing that they must be interpolations. A quick glance at the Pali suttas would show that none of these claims has much substance. The teaching of rebirth crops up almost everywhere in the Canon, and is so closely bound to a host of other doctrines that to remove it would virtually reduce the Dhamma to tatters. Moreover, when the suttas speak about rebirth into the five realms—the hells, the animal world, the spirit realm, the human world, and the heavens—they never hint that these terms are meant symbolically. To the contrary, they even say that rebirth occurs "with the breakup of the body, after death," which clearly implies they intend the idea of rebirth to be taken quite literally.") Thanissaro Bhikkhu, as another example, rejects the "modern argument" that "one can still obtain all the results of the practice without having to accept the possibility of rebirth." He states, "rebirth has always been a central teaching in the Buddhist tradition." (Note: Thanissaro Bhikkhu, The Truth of Rebirth. And Why it Matters for Buddhist Practice) (Note: Thanissaro Bhikkhu: "A second modern argument against accepting the canonical accounts of what's known in awakening—and in particular, the knowledge of rebirth achieved in awakening—is that one can still obtain all the results of the practice without having to accept the possibility of rebirth. After all, all the factors leading to suffering are all immediately present to awareness, so there should be no need, when trying to abandon them, to accept any premises about where they may or may not lead in the future. This objection, however, ignores the role of appropriate attention on the path. As we noted above, one of its roles is to examine and abandon the assumptions that underlie one's views on the metaphysics of personal identity. Unless you're willing to step back from your own views—such as those concerning what a person is, and why that makes rebirth impossible—and subject them to this sort of examination, there's something lacking in your path. You'll remain entangled in the questions of inappropriate attention, which will prevent you from actually identifying and abandoning the causes of suffering and achieving the full results of the practice. In addition, the terms of appropriate attention—the four noble truths—are not concerned simply with events arising and passing away in the present moment. They also focus on the causal connections among those events, connections that occur both in the immediate present and over time. If you limit your focus solely to connections in the present while ignoring those over time, you can't fully comprehend the ways in which craving causes suffering: not only by latching on to the four kinds of nutriment, but also giving rise to the four kinds of nutriment as well.) (Note: According to Konik: No doubt, according to the early Indian Buddhist tradition, the Buddha's great discovery, as condensed in his experience of nirvana, involved the remembrance of his many former existences, presupposing as fact the reality of a never-ending process of rebirth as a source of deep anxiety, and an acceptance of the Buddha's overcoming of that fate as ultimate liberation.)

According to philosopher Owen Flanagan, the Dalai Lama states that "Buddhists believe in rebirth" and that this belief has been common among his followers. However, the Dalai Lama's belief, adds Flanagan, is more sophisticated than ordinary Buddhists, because it is not the same as reincarnation—rebirth in Buddhism is envisioned as happening without the assumption of an "atman, self, soul", but rather through a "consciousness conceived along the anatman lines". (Note: The Dalai Lama himself is regarded to be an incarnation of the thirteen previous Dalai Lamas, who are all manifestations of Avalokitasvara.) The doctrine of rebirth is considered mandatory in Tibetan Buddhism, and across many Buddhist sects.

According to Gowans, for "most ordinary Buddhists, today as well as in the past, their basic moral orientation is governed by belief in karma and rebirth". Buddhist morality hinges on the hope of well being in this lifetime or in future rebirths, with nirvana (enlightenment) a project for a future lifetime. A denial of karma and rebirth undermines their history, moral orientation and religious foundations. According to Keown, most Buddhists in Asia do accept these traditional teachings, and seek better rebirth. (Note: The vast majority of Buddhist lay people, states Kevin Trainor, have historically pursued Buddhist rituals and practices motivated with rebirth into Deva realm. Fowler and others concur with Trainor, stating that better rebirth, not nirvana, has been the primary focus of a vast majority of lay Buddhists. This they attempt through merit accumulation and good kamma. (Note: Merv Foweler: "For a vast majority of Buddhists in Theravadin countries, however, the order of monks is seen by lay Buddhists as a means of gaining the most merit in the hope of accumulating good karma for a better rebirth."))

=== Navayana Buddhism ===
The Navayana, a modernistic interpretation of Buddhism by the Indian leader and Buddhist scholar B. R. Ambedkar, rejected much of traditional Buddhism, including the Four Noble Truths, karma and rebirth, thus turning his new religion into a vehicle for class struggle and social action. According to Ambedkar, Four Noble Truths was "the invention of wrong-headed monks".

== See also ==
- List of Buddhist topics
- Buddhist paths to liberation
- Dependent Origination
- Noble Eightfold Path
- Pariyatti
- Three marks of existence

== Sources ==
Printed sources

Sutta Pitaka

- Bhikkhu Bodhi (2000), The Connected Discourses of the Buddha: A New Translation of the Samyutta Nikaya, Boston: Wisdom Publications, ISBN 0-86171-331-1
- Bhikkhu Nanamoli (translator) (1995), The Middle Length Discourses of the Buddha: A New Translation of the Majjhima Nikaya, Boston: Wisdom Publications, ISBN 0-86171-072-X

Buddhist teachers

- Ajahn Sumedho (2002), The Four Noble Truths, Amaravati Publications
- Ajahn Sucitto (2010), Turning the Wheel of Truth: Commentary on the Buddha's First Teaching, Shambhala
- Batchelor, Stephen (2012), "A Secular Buddhism", Journal of Global Buddhism, 13: 87–107
- Bhikkhu Bodhi (1995a), "Preface", The Middle Length Discourses of the Buddha. A New Translation of the Majjhima Nikaya, Wisdom Publications
- Bhikkhu Bodhi (2011), The Noble Eightfold Path: Way to the End of Suffering (Kindle ed.), Independent Publishers Group
- Bhikkhu Bodhi. "The Four Noble Truths". Archived from the original on 26 August 2018.
- Brazier, David (2001), The Feeling Buddha, Robinson Publishing
- Dhamma, Ven. Dr. Rewata (1997), The First Discourse of the Buddha, Wisdom, ISBN 0-86171-104-1
- Geshe Tashi Tsering (2005), The Four Noble Truths: The Foundation of Buddhist Thought, Volume I (Kindle ed.), Wisdom
- Geshe Tashi Tsering (2006), Buddhist Psychology: The Foundation of Buddhist Thought, Volume III (Kindle ed.), Perseus Books Group
- Goenka, S.N. (2000), The Discourse Summaries, Pariyatti
- Gold, Jonathan C. (2023). "Pyrrho's Buddha on Duḥkha and the Liberation from Views". Journal of the American Academy of Religion, Volume 91, Issue 3, September 2023, Pages 655–679.
- Goldstein, Joseph (2002), One Dharma: The Emerging Western Buddhism, HarperCollins
- Goldstein, Joseph (2013), Mindfulness: A Practical Guide to Awakening (Kindle ed.), Sounds True
- Huxter, Malcolm (2016), Healing the Heart and Mind with Mindfulness: Ancient Path, Present Moment, Routledge, ISBN 978-1-317-50540-2
- Khunu Rinpoche (2012), Vast as the Heavens, Deep as the Sea: Verses in Praise of Bodhicitta, Translated by Thubten Thardo (Gareth Sparham) (Kindle ed.), Wisdom
- Khantipalo, Bhikkhu Phra (2003), Calm and Insight: A Buddhist Manual for Meditators, Routledge
- Lama Surya Das (1997), Awakening the Buddha Within (Kindle ed.), Broadway Books
- Mingyur Rinpoche (2007), The Joy of Living: Unlocking the Secret and Science of Happiness (Kindle ed.), Harmony
- Pema Chodron (2010), Comfortable with Uncertainty: 108 Teachings on Cultivating Fearlessness and Compassion, Shambhala
- Rahula, Walpola (2007), What the Buddha Taught, Grove Press
- Rahula, Walpola (2007a), What the Buddha Taught (Kindle ed.)
- Ringu Tulku (2005), Daring Steps Toward Fearlessness: The Three Vehicles of Tibetan Buddhism, Snow Lion
- Thich Nhat Hanh (1991), Old Path White Clouds, Parallax Press
- Thich Nhat Hanh (1999), The Heart of the Buddha's Teaching, Three River Press
- Traleg Kyabgon (2001), The Essence of Buddhism, Shambhala
- Tsenshap Serkong Rinpoche (1996), Een Lamp voor het Pad naar Verlichting, Uitgeverij Maitreya, ISBN 978-90718-86-089

Scholarly sources

- Alexander, James (2019), "The State Is the Attempt to Strip Metaphor Out of Politics", in Kos, Eric S. (ed.), Michael Oakeshott on Authority, Governance, and the State, Springer
- Analayo (2003), Satipatthana. The Direct Path to Realization (PDF), Windhorse Publications
- Analayo (2006), "The Ekottarika-āgama Parallel to the Saccavibhaṅga-sutta and the Four (Noble) Truths", Buddhist Studies Review, 23: 145–153
- Analayo (2011), "Right View and the Scheme of the Four Truths in Early Buddhism, The Saṃyukta-āgama Parallel to the Sammādiṭṭhi-sutta and the Simile of the Four Skills of a Physician" (PDF), Canadian Journal of Buddhist Studies, 7: 11–44
- Analayo (2012), "The Chinese Parallels to the Dhammacakkappavattana-sutta (1)" (PDF), Journal of the Oxford Centre for Buddhist Studies, 3: 12–46
- Analayo (2013), "The Chinese Parallels to the Dhammacakkappavattana-sutta (2)" (PDF), Journal of the Oxford Centre for Buddhist Studies, 5: 9–41
- Anderson, Carol (1999), Pain and Its Ending: The Four Noble Truths in the Theravada Buddhist Canon, Routledge
- Anderson, Carol (2001), Pain and Its Ending: The Four Noble Truths in the Theravada Buddhist Canon, Motilall Banarsidas
- Anderson, Carol (2003), "Four Noble Truths", in Buswell, Robert E. (ed.), Encyclopedia of Buddhism, Macmillan Reference Books, ISBN 978-0-02-865718-9
- Anderson, Carol (2004). Robert E. Buswell (ed.). Encyclopedia of Buddhism. MacMillan Reference, Thomson Gale. ISBN 0-02-865718-7.
- Anderson, Carol (2013), Pain and Its Ending: The Four Noble Truths in the Theravada Buddhist Canon, Routledge
- Barber, Anthony W. (2008), Buddhism in the Krishna River Valley
- Beckwith, Christopher I. (2015). Greek Buddha: Pyrrho's Encounter with Early Buddhism in Central Asia (PDF). Princeton University Press. ISBN 9781400866328.
- Bhikkhu Bodhi (2016), "The Transformations of Mindfulness", in Purser, Ronald E.; Forbes, David; Burke, Adam (eds.), Handbook of Mindfulness: Culture, Context, and Social Engagement, Springer
- Bronkhorst, Johannes (1993), The Two Traditions of Meditation in Ancient India, Motilal Banarsidass Publ.
- Bronkhorst, Johannes (2000), "Karma and Teleology: A Problem and its Solutions in Indian Philosophy" (PDF), The International Institute for Buddhist Studies of the International College for Advanced Buddhist Studies, Tokyo
- Bucknell, Rod (1984), "The Buddhist Path to Liberation: An Analysis of the Listing of Stages", The Journal of the International Association of Buddhist Studies, 7 (2)
- Buswell, Robert E. Jr.; Gimello, Robert M., eds. (1994), Paths to Liberation. The Marga and its Transformations in Buddhist Thought, Delhi: Motilal Banarsidass Publishers
- Buswell, Robert E. Jr.; Lopez, Donald Jr. (2003), The Princeton Dictionary of Buddhism, Princeton University Press
- Buswell; Lopez (2014), Princeton Dictionary of Buddhism, Princeton University Press
- Carter, John Ross (1987), "Four Noble Truths", in Jones, Lindsay (ed.), MacMillan Encyclopedia of Religions, MacMillan
- Chitkara, M. G. (1998), Buddhism, Reincarnation, and Dalai Lamas of Tibet, APH Publishing
- Choong, Mun-keat (2000), The Fundamental Teachings of Early Buddhism: A Comparative Study Based on the Sutranga Portion of the Pali Samyutta-Nikaya and the Chinese Samyuktagama, Otto Harrassowitz Verlag
- Cohen, Robert S. (2006), Beyond Enlightenment: Buddhism, Religion, Modernity, Routledge
- Coleman, James William (2002), The New Buddhism. The Western Transformation of an Ancient Tradition, Oxford University Press
- Cousins, L.S. (2001), "Review of Pain and its Ending: The Four Noble Truths in the Theravada Buddhist Canon" (PDF), Journal of Buddhist Ethics, 8: 36–41, archived (PDF) from the original on 29 February 2012
- Crosby, Kate (2013), Theravada Buddhism: Continuity, Diversity, and Identity, John Wiley & Sons
- Davidson, Ronald M. (2003), Indian Esoteric Buddhism, Columbia University Press, ISBN 0-231-12618-2
- Egge, James (2013), Religious Giving and the Invention of Karma in Theravada Buddhism, Routledge
- Eliot, Charles (2014), Japanese Buddhism, Routledge, ISBN 978-1-317-79274-1
- Emmanuel, Steven M. (2015), A Companion to Buddhist Philosophy, John Wiley & Sons
- Endo, Toshiichi (2005), "The 'Aṭṭhakathā' as Source-Material of the Pāli Commentaries, An Inquiry into the Date of their Compilation", in Tilakaratne, Asanga (ed.), Dhamma-Vinaya, Essays in Honour of Venerable Professor Dhammavihari, Sri Lanka Association for Buddhist Studies, pp. 33–53
- Flanagan, Owen (2011), The Bodhisattva's Brain: Buddhism Naturalized, MIT Press, ISBN 978-0-262-29723-3
- Flanagan, Owen (2014), Science for Monks: Buddhism and Science: A BIT of The Really Hard Problem, MIT Press
- Fowler, Merv (1999), Buddhism: Beliefs and Practices, Sussex Academic Press, ISBN 978-1-898723-66-0
- Fronsdal, Gil (1998), "Insight Meditation in the United States: Life, Liberty, and the Pursuit of Happiness", in Prebish, Charles S.; Tanaka, Kenneth K. (eds.), The Faces of Buddhism in America, University of California Press
- Fronsdal, Gil (2001), The Issue at Hand (Kindle ed.), self-published
- Geisler, Norman; Amano, J. Yutaka (2004), The Reincarnation Sensation, Wipf and Stock Publishers
- Gethin, Rupert (1998), Foundations of Buddhism, Oxford University Press
- Gethin, R.M. (2003), The Buddhist Path to Awakening, OneWorld Publications
- Gombrich, Richard; Obeyesekere, Ganan (1988), Buddhism Transformed: Religious Change in Sri Lanka, Motilall Banarsidass
- Gombrich, Richard F. (1997), How Buddhism Began: The Conditioned Genesis of the Early Teachings, Routledge, ISBN 978-1-134-19639-5
- Gombrich, Richard (2009), What the Buddha Thought, Equinox
- Gowans, Christopher (2004), Philosophy of the Buddha: An Introduction, Routledge, ISBN 978-1-134-46973-4
- Gowans, Christopher W. (2014), Buddhist Moral Philosophy: An Introduction, Routledge, ISBN 978-1-317-65935-8
- Harris, Elizabeth (2006), Theravada Buddhism and the British Encounter: Religious, Missionary and Colonial Experience in Nineteenth Century Sri Lanka, Routledge
- Harvey, Graham (2016), Religions in Focus: New Approaches to Tradition and Contemporary Practices, Routledge
- Harvey, Peter (2013), An Introduction to Buddhism, Cambridge University Press
- Harvey, Peter (2015), Emmanuel, Steven M. (ed.), A Companion to Buddhist Philosophy, John Wiley & Sons, ISBN 978-1-119-14466-3
- Hayes, Richard P. (2013), "The Internet as Window onto American Buddhism", in Queen, Christopher; Williams, Duncan Ryuken (eds.), American Buddhism: Methods and Findings in Recent Scholarship, Routledge
- Hick, John (1994), Death and Eternal Life, Westminster John Knox Press
- Hirakawa, Akira (1990), A History of Indian Buddhism. From Sakyamuni to Early Mahayana, University of Hawai'i Press, hdl:10125/23030
- Jayatilleke, K.N. (2009), Facets of Buddhist Thought: Collected Essays, Buddhist Publication Society
- Jong, J.W. de (1993), "The Beginnings of Buddhism", The Eastern Buddhist, 26 (2)
- Kalupahana, David J. (1992), A history of Buddhist philosophy, Delhi: Motilal Banarsidass Publishers Private Limited
- Karunyakara, Lella (2002), Modernisation of Buddhism: Contributions of Ambedkar and Dalai Lama XIV, Gyan Books
- Keown, Damien (2000), Buddhism: A Very Short Introduction (Kindle ed.), Oxford University Press
- Keown, Damien (2009), Buddhism, Sterling Publishing, ISBN 978-1-4027-6883-5
- Keown, Damien (2013), Buddhism: A Very Short Introduction, Oxford University Press, ISBN 978-0-19-966383-5
- Kingsland, James (2016), Siddhartha's Brain: Unlocking the Ancient Science of Enlightenment, HarperCollins
- Konik, Adrian (2009), Buddhism and Transgression: The Appropriation of Buddhism in the Contemporary West, BRIIL
- Lamb, Christopher (2001), "Cosmology, myth and symbolism", in Harvey, Peter (ed.), Buddhism, Bloomsbury Publishing
- Leifer, Ron (1997), The Happiness Project, Snow Lion
- Lopez, Donald S (1995), Buddhism in Practice (PDF), Princeton University Press, ISBN 0-691-04442-2
- Lopez, Donald S. (2001), The Story of Buddhism, HarperCollins
- Lopez, Donald, jr. (2009), Buddhism and Science: A Guide for the Perplexed, University of Chicago Press
- Lopez, Donald S. (2012), The Scientific Buddha: His Short and Happy Life, Yale University Press, ISBN 978-0-300-15913-4
- Makransky, John J. (1997), Buddhahood Embodied: Sources of Controversy in India and Tibet, SUNY
- McDermott, James Paul (1975), "The Kathāvatthu Kamma Debates", Journal of the American Oriental Society, vol. 95, no. 3
- McMahan, David L. (2008), The Making of Buddhist Modernism, Oxford University Press, ISBN 9780195183276
- Moffitt, Philip (2008), Dancing with Life: Buddhist Insights for Finding Meaning and Joy in the Face of Suffering (Kindle ed.), Rodale
- Monier-Williams, Monier (1899), A Sanskrit-English Dictionary (PDF), London: Oxford University Press
- Monier-Williams, A Sanskrit-English Dictionary (PDF), London: Oxford University Press
- Norman, K.R. (2003), "The Four Noble Truths" ( (PDF)), K.R. Norman Collected Papers II, archived from the original on 1 January 2020
- Nyanatiloka (1980), Buddhist Dictionary, Buddhist Publication Society
- Ooi, Eng Jin; Skilling, Peter (2026). "The Dhamma wheel from Chainat, Thailand: an epigraphic excerpt from the Pali Dhammacakkappavattana, and related finds". Bulletin of the School of Oriental and African Studies. 89 (1): 105–142. doi:10.1017/S0041977X25100839.
- Potter, Karl (2004), The Encyclopedia of Indian Philosophies, Vol. IX: Buddhist philosophy from 350 to 600 AD
- Prothero, Stephen R. (1996), The White Buddhist: the Asian odyssey of Henry Steel Olcott, Indiana University Press
- Raju, P. T. (1985), Structural Depths of Indian Thought, State University of New York Press, ISBN 978-0-88706-139-4
- Rhys Davids, C. A. F. (1935), "Curious Omissions in Pali Canonical Texts", Journal of the Royal Asiatic Society: 721–724
- Rockhill, William Woodville (1884), The life of the Buddha and the early history of his order, derived from Tibetan works in the Bkah-Hgyur and Bstan-Hgyur, followed by notices on the early history of Tibet and Khoten, London: Trübner
- Samuel, Geoffrey (2008), The Origins of Yoga and Tantra: Indic Religions to the Thirteenth Century, Cambridge University Press
- Schmidt-Leukel, Perry (2006), Understanding Buddhism, Dunedin Academic Press, ISBN 978-1-903765-18-0
- Schmithausen, Lambert (1981), On some Aspects of Descriptions or Theories of 'Liberating Insight' and 'Enlightenment' in Early Buddhism". In: Studien zum Jainismus und Buddhismus (Gedenkschrift für Ludwig Alsdorf), hrsg. von Klaus Bruhn und Albrecht Wezler, Wiesbaden
- Schmithausen, Lambert (1986), "Critical response", in Neufeldt, Ronald W. (ed.), Karma and rebirth: Post-Classical Developments, State University of New York
- Sharf, Robert H. (1995), "Buddhist Modernism and the Rhetoric of Meditative Experience" (PDF), NUMEN, 42 (3): 228–283, doi:10.1163/1568527952598549, hdl:2027.42/43810, archived from the original (PDF) on 12 April 2019
- Sharf, Robert H. (2000), "The Rhetoric of Experience and the Study of Religion" (PDF), Journal of Consciousness Studies, 7 (11–12): 267–87, archived from the original (PDF) on 13 May 2013
- Smith, Huston; Novak, Philip (2009), Buddhism: A Concise Introduction (Kindle ed.), HarperOne
- Snelling, John (1987), The Buddhist handbook. A Complete Guide to Buddhist Teaching and Practice, London: Century Paperbacks
- Spiro, Melford E. (1982), Buddhism and Society: A Great Tradition and Its Burmese Vicissitudes, University of California Press
- Taylor, Philip (2007), Modernity and Re-enchantment: Religion in Post-revolutionary Vietnam, Institute of Southeast Asian Studies
- Trainor, Kevin (2004), Buddhism: The Illustrated Guide, Oxford University Press, ISBN 978-0-19-517398-7
- Vetter, Tilmann (1988), The Ideas and Meditative Practices of Early Buddhism, BRILL
- Wallace, B. Alan (2002), "The Spectrum of Buddhist Practice in the West", in Prebish, Charles S.; Baumann, Martin (eds.), Westward Dharma: Buddhism Beyond Asia, University of California Press, ISBN 0-520-23490-1
- Warder, A.K. (1999), Indian Buddhism, Delhi
- Warder, A.K. (2000), Indian Buddhism, Motilal Banarsidass Publ.
- Watson, Burton (1993), The Lotus Sutra, Columbia University Press
- Williams, Paul (1989), Mahayana Buddhism
- Williams, Paul (2008), Mahayana Buddhism: The Doctrinal Foundations, Routledge
- Williams, Paul; Tribe, Anthony; Wynne, Alexander (2002), Buddhist Thought (Kindle ed.), Taylor & Francis
- Williams, Paul; Tribe, Anthony; Wynne, Alexander (2012), Buddhist Thought (2nd ed.), Routledge, ISBN 978-1-136-52088-4
- Wynne, Alexander (16 April 2007). The Origin of Buddhist Meditation. Routledge. ISBN 978-1-134-09740-1.
- Zyporin, Brook (2022). "Tiantai Buddhism". Stanford Encyclopedia of Philosophy.

Web sources
