= Sixteen characteristics =

The sixteen characteristics are an extended elaboration of the Four Noble Truths. For each truth, they describe four characteristics.

== Tibetan tradition ==
The Tibetan tradition emphasizes the study of the sixteen characteristics of the Four Noble Truths, as described in the Abhisamayalamkara. The Mahayana text Ornament of Clear Realization (Abhisamayalamkara) identifies four characteristics of each truth, for a total of sixteen characteristics, which are presented as a guide to contemplating and practicing the four noble truths. The Ornament of Clear Realization is a key text in the curriculum of Tibetan Buddhist monasteries and study colleges, and this method of study and practice is emphasized in the Tibetan tradition.

== Description ==
These sixteen characteristics are identified as follows:

=== Truth of suffering ===
These characteristics refer to the five aggregates

1. impermanence - the five aggregates are impermanent and change from moment to moment
2. suffering - the five aggregates have come into being because of avidya (ignorance) and kleshas (disturbing emotions), and they are under the influence of the avidya and kleshas
3. emptiness - there is no "self" outside of the five aggregates that controls or makes use of the five aggregates
4. selflessness - there is no "self" to be found within the five aggregates that controls or makes use of the five aggregates

=== Truth of origin ===
These characteristics refer to karma, kleshas, and avidya (ignorance)

1. causes - karma, kleshas, and avidya are constantly arising within our mental continuum, and because of their nature they have the quality of being the causes of suffering.
2. origin - kleshas and karma are the actual origin of suffering, not just intermediate links.
3. strong production - avidya, kleshas, and karma act forcefully as the main causes of suffering (they are not just passive ingredients)
4. condition - avidya, kleshas, and karma are more than just the main causes of suffering, they are also the contributory causes

=== Truth of cessation ===
These characteristics refer to cessation

1. cessation - cessation is the ceasing of all kleshas and avidya forever
2. pacification - cessation pacifies the torment of suffering, brings true peace
3. being superb - cessation is supreme in bringing about the source of all health and happiness
4. definite emergence - cessation will definitely bring us out of samsara

=== Truth of the path ===
These characteristics refer to the path

1. path - the path leads to cessation
2. awareness - the path leads us to a full and complete understanding of the root of cyclic existence (samsara) and the means to escape it
3. achievement - through the path, we can definitely achieve the result of liberation and enlightenment
4. deliverance - the path delivers us from the bondage of our conditioned existence

== Sources ==
- Berzin, Alexander. "The Sixteen Aspects of the Four Noble Truths". Study Buddhism.
- Geshe Tashi Tsering (2005), The Four Noble Truths: The Foundation of Buddhist Thought, Volume I, Wisdom, Kindle Edition
