= What the Buddha Taught =

1959 book by Walpola Rahula

- Author: Walpola Rahula
- Subject: Buddhism
- Publisher: Oneworld Publications
- Publication date: 1959
- ISBN: 0-8021-3031-3

What the Buddha Taught, by Theravadin Walpola Rahula, is a widely used introductory book on Buddhism. Using quotes from the suttas, Rahula gives his personal interpretation of what he regards to be Buddhism's essential teachings, including the Four Noble Truths, the Buddhist mind, the Noble Eightfold Path, meditation and mental development, and the world today.

== Background and reception ==
Rahula's book is an example of "Protestant Buddhism," the Sinhalese version of Buddhist modernism. Due to its rational presentation of Buddhism, which suited western expectations, What the Buddha Taught is a widely read and highly influential introduction to Buddhist thought. (Note: According to Gimello 2004, p. 240-241), also quoted in Taylor 2007, p. 361, Protestant Buddhism "was created in an accommodating response to western expectations, and in nearly diametrical opposition to Buddhism as it had actually been practised in traditional Theravada." See also Richard Gombrich, Theravada Buddhism, chapter 7, "Protestant Buddhism"; and David L. McMahan (2008), The Making of Buddhist Modernism, Oxford University Press, pp. 50–52.)

A French translation was published in 1961. Walpola Rahula himself translated his book into French, encouraged by the orientalist Paul Demiéville, professor at the Collège de France (Note: Walpola Rahula spoke French very well, having spent several years in France. In 1950, following Paul Demiéville's recommendation, Rahula was awarded a scholarship by the French government to study the Mahayana, although he was a Theravada monk. Thus, in 1961, two years after the publication of "What the Buddha Taught", the French translation was published under the title "L'enseignement du Bouddha").

Following in Paul Demiéville's footsteps, the work was very well received by specialists in Buddhology such as André Bareau, also a professor at the Collège de France and at the École pratique des hautes études, who wrote in a review:

This book is an excellent introduction to Buddhism, clear and precise, based on the canonical texts, explained and commented on by one of the most learned Buddhist teachers of our time, and one of those who, without betraying it, seeks to adapt the Buddha's teaching to the demands of modern life. (...) Although this work is addressed to the general public, orientalists will be pleased to find a number of useful clarifications relating to some of the most important and controversial problems in Buddhist studies. (Note: Text in French: Ce livre constitue une excellente introduction au Bouddhisme, claire, précise, basée sur les textes canoniques pâlis, expliqués et commentés par l'un des plus savants docteurs bouddhiques de notre temps, et l'un de ceux qui, sans le trahir, cherchent à adapter aux exigences de la vie moderne l'enseignement du Bouddha. (…) Bien que cet ouvrage s'adresse au grand public, les orientalistes seront heureux d'y trouver un certain nombre d'utiles mises au point se rapportant à quelques-uns des problèmes les plus importants et les plus controversés des études bouddhiques.)

The "most important and controversial problems in Buddhist studies" to which A. Bareau alludes to are probably those relating to the "Protestant Buddhism" mentioned above. This work contributed to the discovery of Buddhism in France. (Note: Since 1961 there have been four reissues, in 1974, 1978, 2009, 2014.)

== Contents ==
The book is divided in 8 chapters, completed by 10 selected suttas and 4 sections: Abbreviations, Selected Bibliography, Glossary, Index. There are 25 illustrations.

DEDICATION
To Mani
Sabbadānaṃ dhammadānaṃ jināti
"The gift of Truth excels all other gifts"
- Chapter I: The Buddhist Attitude of Mind

1. Man is supreme- 2. One is one's refuge- 3. Responsibility- 4. Doubt- 5. Freedom of Thought- 6. Tolerance- 7. Is Buddhism Religion or Philosophy ?- 8. Truth as no label- 9. No blind faith or belief, but seeing and understanding- 10. No attachment even to Truth- 11. Parable of the raft- 12. Imaginary speculations useless- 13. Practical attitude- 14. Parable of the wounded man.

THE FOUR NOBLE TRUTHS
- Chapter II: The First Noble Truth: Dukkha

1. Buddhism neither pessimistic nor optimistic, but realistic- 2. Meaning of "Dukkha "- 3. Three aspects of experience- 4. What is a "being " ?- 5. Five Aggrgates- 6. No spirit opposed to matter- 7. Flux- 8. Thinker end Thought- 9. Has life a beginning?

- Chapter III: The Second Noble Truth: Samudaya: The Arising of Dukkha

1. Definition- 2. Four Nutriments- 3. Root cause of suffering and continuity- 4. Nature of arising and cessation- 5. Karma end Rebirth- 6. What is death ?- 7. What is rebirth ?

- Chapter IV: The Third Noble Truth: Nirodha: The Cessation of Dukkha

1. What is Nirvāṇa?- 2. Language and absolute Truth- 3. Definitions of Nirvāṇa- 4. Nirvāṇa not negative- 5. Nirvāṇa as Absolute Truth- 6. What is Absolute Truth ?- 7. Truth is not negative- 8. Nirvāṇa and Saṃsāra- 9. Nirvāṇa not a result- 10. What is there after Nirvāṇa ?- 11. Incorrect expressions- 12.What happens to an Arahant after death ?- 13.If no Self, who realizes Nirvāṇa ?- 14. Nirvāṇa in this life.

- Chapter V: The Fourth Noble Truth: Magga: The Path

1. Middle Path or Noble Eightfold Path- 2. Compassion and Wisdom- 3.Ethical Conduct- 4. Mental Discipline- 5. Wisdom- 6. Two sorts of Understanding- 7. Four Functions regarding the Four Noble Truths.

- Chapter VI: The Doctrine of Non-Soul: Anatta

1. What is Soul or Self ?- 2. God end Soul: Self-protection and Self-preservation- 3. Teaching "Against the Current"-4. Analytical and Synthetical methods- 5. Conditioned Genesis- 6. Question of Free-will- 7. Two Kinds of Truths- 8. Some erroneous views- 9. The Buddha definitely denies "Atman"- 10. The Buddha's silence- 11.The idea of Self a vague impression- 12. Correct attitude- 13. If no Self, who gets the result of Karma ?- 14. Doctrine of Anatta not negative.

- Chapter VII:Meditation or Mental Culture: Bhāvanā

1. Erroneous views- 2. Meditation is not escape from life- 3. Two forms of Meditation- 3.The Setting-up of Mindfulness- 4."Meditation " on breathing- 5.Mindfulness of activities- 6. Living in the present moment- 7 ."Meditation " on Sensations – on Mind – on Ethical, Spiritual and Intellectual subjects.

- Chapter VIII: What the Buddha Taught and the World Today

1.Erroneous views- 2 . Buddhism for all- 3. In daily life- 4. Family and social life- 5. Lay life held in high esteem- 6. How to become a Buddhist- 7. Social and economic problems- 8. Poverty: cause of crime-9. Material and spiritual progress- 10. Four kinds of happiness for laymen. 11. On politics, war and peace- 12. Is it practical ?- 13. Asoka'a example- 14. The Aim of Buddhism.

SELECTED TEXTS

- Setting in Motion the Wheel of Truth (Dhammacakkappavattana Sutta).

- The Fire Sermon (Ādittapariyāya Sutta).

- Universal Love (Metta Sutta).

- Blessings (Maṅgala Sutta).

- Getting rid of All Cares and Troubles (Sabbasava-Sutta).

- The Parable of the Piece of Cloth (Vatthupama Sutta

- The Foundations of Mindfulness (Satipatthana Sutta).

- Advice to Sigāla (Sigālovāda Sutta)

- The Words of Truth (Dhammapada (Note: Walpola Rahula offers the translation of a selection of 25 excerpts from the Dhammapada (not the entire collection of the Buddha's sayings).)

- The Last Words of the Buddha (from the Mahāparinibbāna Sutta (Note: This is a translation of selected excerpts from the Mahāparinibbāna Sutta, which is the longest text of the Pali Canon.)

- Abbreviations, Selected Bibliography, Glossary, Index and 25 illustrations.

== Publication data ==
- Original edition: What The Buddha Taught. Oneworld Publications, Oxford. 1959. ISBN 0-8021-3031-3.

- Second edition: What the Buddha Taught, Grove Press, New York City, 1974, 151 pages, ISBN 9780802130310.

== Translations ==
Few works on Buddhism published in the 1950s continue to be regularly reissued and translated, more than sixty years after their first edition. "What the Buddha Taught" is one of these exceptions. (Note: The original 1959 edition in English was first translated into French in 1961. The most recent translation (as of 2025) is the one in Greek in 2022.)

The book has been translated into multiple languages including (non-exhaustive list classified in alphabetical order of languages):

- French: Tr. Walpola Rahula (who spoke French) (1961). L'enseignement du Bouddha (in French). Éditions du Seuil, collection « Points / Sagesses » N°13. p. 200. ISBN 2-02-003177-9. Reprint: 1974, 1978, 2009, 2014.
  Also available on Internet Archive: L'enseignement du Bouddha.
- German: Tr. Unknown (1982). Was der Buddha lehrt (in German). Origo Verlag. p. 226. ISBN 9783282000388., second edition in 2023.
- Greek: Tr. Nyanadassana Mahathera (2022). Αυτά που ο Βούδας Δίδαξε (in Greek). Ekdoseis Theravada, Athens. p. 164. ISBN 978-618-86185-0-3.
- Italian: Tr.Maria Angela Falà (2019). L'insegnamento del Buddha (in Italian). Adelphi, Piccola Bibliotheca N°745. p. 231. ISBN 9788845934360.
- Spanish: Tr. Gilberto Lachassagne (1997). Lo Que Buddha Enseno (in Spanish). Buenos Aires, Argentina: Kier. p. 198. ISBN 9789501710076.
- Chinese: 中文。Tr. Chanworld.org (2024)谌飚译. 《佛陀的教导》现代汉语版. 2024.
- Burmese: မြတ်ဗုဒ္ဓဒေသနာ၊ ဦးကိုလေး (ဇေယျာမောင်) - 1978, Reprint: 1979, 1980, 1984, 1988, 1999

== Sources ==
- Anderson, Carol (2001), Pain and Its Ending: The Four Noble Truths in the Theravada Buddhist Canon, Motilall Banarsidas
- Gimello, Robert M. (2004), "Icon and Incantation: the Goddess Zhunti and the Role of Images in the Occult Buddhism of Cina", in Granoff, Phyllis; Shinohara, Shinohara (eds.), Images in Asian Religions: Text and Contexts, UBC Press
- Jenkins, Stephen (2002), "Black Ships, Blavatsky, and the Pizza Effect", in Hori, Victor Sōgen; Hayes, Richard P.; Shields, James Mark (eds.), Teaching Buddhism in the West: From the Wheel to the Web, Psychology Press
- McMahan, David L. (2008), The Making of Buddhist Modernism, Oxford University Press
- Taylor, Philip (2007), Modernity and Re-enchantment: Religion in Post-revolutionary Vietnam, Institute of Southeast Asian Studies

== Bibliography ==
At least two authors have cited What the Buddha Taught in their work:

- Robert E. Ornstein (1972). The Psychology of Consciousness. W. H. Freeman and Company. p. 247. ISBN 9780670581986., quoted passage, see pages: 109-110, 128-129, 141, 236.
- Robert Desjarlais (1992). The Aesthetics of Illness and Healing in the Nepal Himalayas. University of Pennsylvania Press. p. 300. ISBN 9780812214345., quoted passage, see pages 292.

== See also ==
- Buddhist modernism
- Buddhism in the West
