= Walpola Rahula Thera =

Sri Lankan Buddhist monk (1907–1997)

- Title: Professor

Personal life
- Born: 9 May 1907 Walpola, Sri Lanka
- Died: 18 September 1997 (aged 90) Colombo, Sri Lanka

Religious life
- Religion: Buddhism
- School: Theravada

Walpola Rahula Thera (9 May 1907–18 September 1997) was a Sri Lankan Buddhist monk, scholar and writer. In 1964, he became the Professor of History and Religions at Northwestern University, thus becoming the first bhikkhu to hold a professorial chair in the Western world. He also once held the position of Vice-Chancellor at the then Vidyodaya University (currently known as the University of Sri Jayewardenepura). He has written extensively about Buddhism in English, French and Sinhala. He wrote the book What the Buddha Taught about Theravada Buddhism.

== Biography ==
He was born on 9 May 1907 at Walpola, a small village in the Galle district of southern Sri Lanka. At thirteen, he entered the Sangha. His education covered Sinhala, Pali, Sanskrit, Buddhism, history and philosophy. He studied at the Vidyalankara Pirivena and at the University of Ceylon, where he associated with E. F. C. Ludowyk, G. P. Malalasekera, E. W. Adikaram and other scholars. After his period at the Sorbonne, he became Vice-Chancellor of Vidyodaya University. He was noted not only for his erudition but also for his strong socialist views, as well as his belief that monks have a duty to play a role in guiding the political consciousness of the people. His book Bhikshuvakage Urumaya (Heritage of the Bhikkhu) was an influential text advocating for the monks' involvement in social and political projects. Rahula's writings were also influential on the Buddhist Nationalist movement that led to the 1956 electoral victory of Solomon Bandaranaike. He left Vidyodaya University in 1969, due to political differences with the government of the day. Thereafter, he returned to the West and worked in many academic institutions in Europe. He returned to Sri Lanka during his last days, and lived in the temple near the New Parliament in Kotte, until his death.

=== Academic career ===
Rahula Thera attended Ceylon university (now known as the University of Peradeniya). He obtained a B.A. Honours degree (London), and then earned a Doctorate of Philosophy, having written a thesis on the History of Buddhism in Sri Lanka (Ceylon). Then he went on to study Indian Philosophy at Calcutta University and later studied Mahayana at the Sorbonne. It was during his time at the Sorbonne in the late 1950s that he produced What the Buddha Taught, a widely read and highly influential introductory text on Buddhism, for which he is best known.

Walpola Rahula Thera is the first Buddhist monk to become a professor in a Western University. When he became Professor of History and Literature of Religions there were no Theravada Temples in the United States. He later became a Professor Emeritus at the same university. Rahula also held positions at several other American Universities. He was a visiting lecturer at Swarthmore College and Regents Lecturer at UCLA. He became Vice-Chancellor of Vidyoda University (now Sri Jayawardhanapura University) in 1964. He was later instrumental in encouraging the formation of the first Theravada temple in the United States, the Washington Buddhist Vihara, located in Washington, D.C.

In 1950, on the recommendation of Paul Demiéville, a member and professor at the Collège de France, he was awarded a grant by the French government to study Mahayana Buddhism as taught by Asanga, an Indian monk and philosopher from the 4th century AD. Although Walpola Rahula belonged to the "Way of the elders" (Theravada) tradition, he had expressed the wish to "learn the practice of Tibetan and Chinese texts in order to broaden his ecumenism".

== Titles ==
Rahula Thera was awarded several titles during his lifetime. The highest honorary title, Tripitakavagisvaracarya (Supreme Master of Buddhist Scriptures), was given him by Sri Kalyapi Samagri Sanghasabha (the Chapter of the Sangha in Sri Lanka) in 1965, with the qualification Sri (Gracious), a title held by only two or three scholars in Sri Lanka. He was also awarded the title "Aggamaha Panditha" from Burma.

== Publications ==
Rahula Thera wrote extensively about Theravada Buddhism. Apart from his world-renowned book What the Buddha Taught, he published an enormous number of papers on Buddhism. Notable books written by him include, History of Buddhism in Ceylon, Heritage of the Bhikkhu, Zen and the Taming of the Bull and Le Compendium de la Super Doctrine (French).

- What the Buddha Taught (1959, ISBN 0-8021-3031-3)
- History of Buddhism in Ceylon: The Anuradhapura Period, 3rd Century BC – 10th Century AD (1966)
- Humour in Pali Literature and Other Essays (1997, ISBN 955-650-000-6)
- The Heritage of the Bhikkhu: A Short History of the Bhikkhu in Educational, Cultural, Social, and Political Life (1974, ISBN 0-394-49260-9)
- Heritage of Bhikkhu (1974, ISBN 0-394-17823-8)
- Zen and the Taming of the Bull: Towards the Definition of Buddhist Thought: Essays (1978, ISBN 0-900406-69-0)
- The Heritage of the Bhikkhu: The Buddhist Tradition of Service (2003, ISBN 0-8021-4023-8)

== See also ==
- "Basic Points Unifying the Theravāda and the Mahāyāna" (1967/1981), developed by Ven. Rahula.

== Sources ==
- Anderson, Carol (2001), Pain and Its Ending: The Four Noble Truths in the Theravada Buddhist Canon, Motilall Banarsidas
- Gimello, Robert M. (2004), "Icon and Incantation: the Goddess Zhunti and the Role of Images in the Occult Buddhism of Cina", in Granoff, Phyllis; Shinohara, Shinohara (eds.), Images in Asian Religions: Text and Contexts, UBC Press
- Jenkins, Stephen (2002), "Black Ships, Blavatsky, and the Pizza Effect", in Hori, Victor Sōgen; Hayes, Richard P.; Shields, James Mark (eds.), Teaching Buddhism in the West: From the Wheel to the Web, Psychology Press
