= Kate Crosby =

Kate Crosby is a British scholar of Theravāda Buddhism who is the Numata Professor of Buddhist Studies at the University of Oxford. She is affiliated with the Faculty of Asian and Middle Eastern Studies and Balliol College.

== Early life and education ==
Crosby studied Sanskrit with Pāli at St Hugh’s College, Oxford (1986–1989). She furthered her studies through the Michael Foster Memorial Scholarship at the University of Hamburg and the Commonwealth Scholarship at the University of Kelaniya in Sri Lanka, followed by traditional Sanskrit study in Pune and Varanasi. She completed her DPhil at Oxford in 1999 with a thesis on medieval Sri Lankan Pāli literature.

== Career ==
Crosby has held academic positions at the universities of Edinburgh, Lancaster, Cardiff, SOAS London, and King’s College London, and has held visiting professorships in Canada, Taiwan, South Korea, and Cambodia. She currently leads the Numata Professorship at Oxford, teaching Buddhist Studies, Pāli, and Buddhist Sanskrit.

She also co-edits the international peer-reviewed journal Contemporary Buddhism.

== Selected works ==
=== Books ===
- Theravāda Buddhism: Continuity, Diversity, Identity
- Esoteric Theravāda: The Story of the Forgotten Meditation Tradition of Southeast Asia
